

584001–584100 

|-bgcolor=#d6d6d6
| 584001 ||  || — || August 31, 2016 || Mount Lemmon || Mount Lemmon Survey ||  || align=right | 2.2 km || 
|-id=002 bgcolor=#d6d6d6
| 584002 ||  || — || August 30, 2016 || Haleakala || Pan-STARRS ||  || align=right | 2.2 km || 
|-id=003 bgcolor=#d6d6d6
| 584003 ||  || — || August 29, 2016 || Mount Lemmon || Mount Lemmon Survey ||  || align=right | 2.3 km || 
|-id=004 bgcolor=#d6d6d6
| 584004 ||  || — || August 28, 2016 || Mount Lemmon || Mount Lemmon Survey ||  || align=right | 1.9 km || 
|-id=005 bgcolor=#d6d6d6
| 584005 ||  || — || August 30, 2016 || Mount Lemmon || Mount Lemmon Survey ||  || align=right | 2.9 km || 
|-id=006 bgcolor=#d6d6d6
| 584006 ||  || — || August 30, 2016 || Haleakala || Pan-STARRS ||  || align=right | 2.4 km || 
|-id=007 bgcolor=#d6d6d6
| 584007 ||  || — || August 27, 2016 || Haleakala || Pan-STARRS ||  || align=right | 2.3 km || 
|-id=008 bgcolor=#d6d6d6
| 584008 ||  || — || August 30, 2016 || Mount Lemmon || Mount Lemmon Survey ||  || align=right | 2.5 km || 
|-id=009 bgcolor=#d6d6d6
| 584009 ||  || — || July 31, 2005 || Palomar || NEAT ||  || align=right | 2.8 km || 
|-id=010 bgcolor=#fefefe
| 584010 ||  || — || January 24, 2015 || Haleakala || Pan-STARRS || H || align=right data-sort-value="0.66" | 660 m || 
|-id=011 bgcolor=#fefefe
| 584011 ||  || — || February 27, 2015 || Haleakala || Pan-STARRS ||  || align=right data-sort-value="0.78" | 780 m || 
|-id=012 bgcolor=#E9E9E9
| 584012 ||  || — || May 26, 2015 || Haleakala || Pan-STARRS ||  || align=right | 2.4 km || 
|-id=013 bgcolor=#d6d6d6
| 584013 ||  || — || October 11, 2006 || Palomar || NEAT ||  || align=right | 3.7 km || 
|-id=014 bgcolor=#fefefe
| 584014 ||  || — || November 25, 2011 || Haleakala || Pan-STARRS || H || align=right data-sort-value="0.93" | 930 m || 
|-id=015 bgcolor=#d6d6d6
| 584015 ||  || — || October 20, 2006 || Kitt Peak || Spacewatch ||  || align=right | 2.3 km || 
|-id=016 bgcolor=#d6d6d6
| 584016 ||  || — || July 29, 2005 || Palomar || NEAT ||  || align=right | 3.7 km || 
|-id=017 bgcolor=#d6d6d6
| 584017 ||  || — || September 4, 2011 || Haleakala || Pan-STARRS ||  || align=right | 2.3 km || 
|-id=018 bgcolor=#d6d6d6
| 584018 ||  || — || December 11, 2002 || Palomar || NEAT ||  || align=right | 2.9 km || 
|-id=019 bgcolor=#E9E9E9
| 584019 ||  || — || June 7, 2016 || Haleakala || Pan-STARRS ||  || align=right | 2.6 km || 
|-id=020 bgcolor=#d6d6d6
| 584020 ||  || — || May 18, 2015 || Haleakala || Pan-STARRS ||  || align=right | 2.0 km || 
|-id=021 bgcolor=#d6d6d6
| 584021 ||  || — || November 14, 2007 || Kitt Peak || Spacewatch ||  || align=right | 1.8 km || 
|-id=022 bgcolor=#d6d6d6
| 584022 ||  || — || September 29, 2011 || Mount Lemmon || Mount Lemmon Survey ||  || align=right | 2.5 km || 
|-id=023 bgcolor=#d6d6d6
| 584023 ||  || — || November 3, 2005 || Mount Lemmon || Mount Lemmon Survey ||  || align=right | 2.2 km || 
|-id=024 bgcolor=#d6d6d6
| 584024 ||  || — || April 4, 2014 || Mount Lemmon || Mount Lemmon Survey ||  || align=right | 2.8 km || 
|-id=025 bgcolor=#d6d6d6
| 584025 ||  || — || July 8, 2005 || Kitt Peak || Spacewatch ||  || align=right | 3.2 km || 
|-id=026 bgcolor=#d6d6d6
| 584026 ||  || — || December 15, 2001 || Apache Point || SDSS Collaboration ||  || align=right | 3.0 km || 
|-id=027 bgcolor=#fefefe
| 584027 ||  || — || December 20, 2014 || Haleakala || Pan-STARRS || H || align=right data-sort-value="0.51" | 510 m || 
|-id=028 bgcolor=#d6d6d6
| 584028 ||  || — || November 3, 2011 || Kitt Peak || Spacewatch ||  || align=right | 2.5 km || 
|-id=029 bgcolor=#d6d6d6
| 584029 ||  || — || January 15, 2013 || ESA OGS || ESA OGS ||  || align=right | 3.1 km || 
|-id=030 bgcolor=#d6d6d6
| 584030 ||  || — || November 18, 2006 || Mount Lemmon || Mount Lemmon Survey ||  || align=right | 2.9 km || 
|-id=031 bgcolor=#E9E9E9
| 584031 ||  || — || March 28, 2015 || Haleakala || Pan-STARRS ||  || align=right data-sort-value="0.90" | 900 m || 
|-id=032 bgcolor=#FA8072
| 584032 ||  || — || September 21, 2011 || Catalina || CSS || H || align=right data-sort-value="0.59" | 590 m || 
|-id=033 bgcolor=#d6d6d6
| 584033 ||  || — || August 1, 2000 || Cerro Tololo || M. W. Buie, S. D. Kern ||  || align=right | 2.7 km || 
|-id=034 bgcolor=#FA8072
| 584034 ||  || — || August 30, 2006 || Anderson Mesa || LONEOS ||  || align=right data-sort-value="0.59" | 590 m || 
|-id=035 bgcolor=#d6d6d6
| 584035 ||  || — || September 10, 2016 || Mount Lemmon || Mount Lemmon Survey ||  || align=right | 2.8 km || 
|-id=036 bgcolor=#d6d6d6
| 584036 ||  || — || July 4, 2010 || Mount Lemmon || Mount Lemmon Survey ||  || align=right | 3.1 km || 
|-id=037 bgcolor=#d6d6d6
| 584037 ||  || — || May 21, 2015 || Haleakala || Pan-STARRS ||  || align=right | 2.1 km || 
|-id=038 bgcolor=#d6d6d6
| 584038 ||  || — || March 24, 2014 || Haleakala || Pan-STARRS ||  || align=right | 2.6 km || 
|-id=039 bgcolor=#d6d6d6
| 584039 ||  || — || August 30, 2005 || Kitt Peak || Spacewatch ||  || align=right | 2.7 km || 
|-id=040 bgcolor=#fefefe
| 584040 ||  || — || October 3, 2006 || Mount Lemmon || Mount Lemmon Survey ||  || align=right data-sort-value="0.58" | 580 m || 
|-id=041 bgcolor=#fefefe
| 584041 ||  || — || July 14, 2016 || Haleakala || Pan-STARRS ||  || align=right data-sort-value="0.65" | 650 m || 
|-id=042 bgcolor=#E9E9E9
| 584042 ||  || — || November 19, 2003 || Kitt Peak || Spacewatch ||  || align=right | 2.2 km || 
|-id=043 bgcolor=#d6d6d6
| 584043 ||  || — || September 28, 1994 || Kitt Peak || Spacewatch ||  || align=right | 3.0 km || 
|-id=044 bgcolor=#d6d6d6
| 584044 ||  || — || October 27, 2011 || Mount Lemmon || Mount Lemmon Survey ||  || align=right | 2.5 km || 
|-id=045 bgcolor=#d6d6d6
| 584045 ||  || — || August 30, 2005 || Kitt Peak || Spacewatch ||  || align=right | 2.4 km || 
|-id=046 bgcolor=#fefefe
| 584046 ||  || — || January 25, 2015 || Haleakala || Pan-STARRS || H || align=right data-sort-value="0.60" | 600 m || 
|-id=047 bgcolor=#d6d6d6
| 584047 ||  || — || August 30, 2005 || Palomar || NEAT ||  || align=right | 3.4 km || 
|-id=048 bgcolor=#d6d6d6
| 584048 ||  || — || August 30, 2005 || Kitt Peak || Spacewatch ||  || align=right | 3.4 km || 
|-id=049 bgcolor=#d6d6d6
| 584049 ||  || — || October 1, 2005 || Mount Lemmon || Mount Lemmon Survey ||  || align=right | 2.6 km || 
|-id=050 bgcolor=#E9E9E9
| 584050 ||  || — || September 9, 2007 || Kitt Peak || Spacewatch ||  || align=right | 1.9 km || 
|-id=051 bgcolor=#d6d6d6
| 584051 ||  || — || October 24, 2011 || Haleakala || Pan-STARRS ||  || align=right | 1.9 km || 
|-id=052 bgcolor=#d6d6d6
| 584052 ||  || — || November 30, 2011 || Mount Lemmon || Mount Lemmon Survey ||  || align=right | 3.4 km || 
|-id=053 bgcolor=#d6d6d6
| 584053 ||  || — || September 12, 2016 || Mount Lemmon || Mount Lemmon Survey ||  || align=right | 2.1 km || 
|-id=054 bgcolor=#d6d6d6
| 584054 ||  || — || September 10, 2016 || Mount Lemmon || Mount Lemmon Survey ||  || align=right | 3.2 km || 
|-id=055 bgcolor=#d6d6d6
| 584055 ||  || — || October 24, 2011 || Haleakala || Pan-STARRS ||  || align=right | 2.1 km || 
|-id=056 bgcolor=#E9E9E9
| 584056 ||  || — || November 7, 2008 || Mount Lemmon || Mount Lemmon Survey ||  || align=right | 1.5 km || 
|-id=057 bgcolor=#d6d6d6
| 584057 ||  || — || September 30, 2011 || Kitt Peak || Spacewatch ||  || align=right | 2.5 km || 
|-id=058 bgcolor=#d6d6d6
| 584058 ||  || — || February 21, 2002 || Kitt Peak || Spacewatch ||  || align=right | 3.3 km || 
|-id=059 bgcolor=#d6d6d6
| 584059 ||  || — || October 24, 2011 || Haleakala || Pan-STARRS ||  || align=right | 2.0 km || 
|-id=060 bgcolor=#d6d6d6
| 584060 ||  || — || September 18, 2001 || Apache Point || SDSS Collaboration ||  || align=right | 2.7 km || 
|-id=061 bgcolor=#d6d6d6
| 584061 ||  || — || October 22, 2006 || Palomar || NEAT ||  || align=right | 2.9 km || 
|-id=062 bgcolor=#d6d6d6
| 584062 ||  || — || December 27, 2006 || Mount Lemmon || Mount Lemmon Survey ||  || align=right | 2.3 km || 
|-id=063 bgcolor=#d6d6d6
| 584063 ||  || — || May 22, 2015 || Haleakala || Pan-STARRS ||  || align=right | 2.4 km || 
|-id=064 bgcolor=#d6d6d6
| 584064 ||  || — || September 12, 2016 || Mount Lemmon || Mount Lemmon Survey ||  || align=right | 2.5 km || 
|-id=065 bgcolor=#d6d6d6
| 584065 ||  || — || April 25, 2015 || Haleakala || Pan-STARRS ||  || align=right | 2.2 km || 
|-id=066 bgcolor=#d6d6d6
| 584066 ||  || — || October 2, 2005 || Palomar || NEAT ||  || align=right | 3.0 km || 
|-id=067 bgcolor=#d6d6d6
| 584067 ||  || — || August 30, 2016 || Mount Lemmon || Mount Lemmon Survey ||  || align=right | 2.7 km || 
|-id=068 bgcolor=#d6d6d6
| 584068 ||  || — || September 2, 2016 || Mount Lemmon || Mount Lemmon Survey ||  || align=right | 2.9 km || 
|-id=069 bgcolor=#d6d6d6
| 584069 ||  || — || September 12, 2016 || Haleakala || Pan-STARRS ||  || align=right | 3.0 km || 
|-id=070 bgcolor=#E9E9E9
| 584070 ||  || — || February 10, 1996 || Kitt Peak || Spacewatch ||  || align=right | 1.3 km || 
|-id=071 bgcolor=#d6d6d6
| 584071 ||  || — || September 6, 2016 || Mount Lemmon || Mount Lemmon Survey ||  || align=right | 2.2 km || 
|-id=072 bgcolor=#fefefe
| 584072 ||  || — || October 1, 2011 || Mount Lemmon || Mount Lemmon Survey || H || align=right data-sort-value="0.71" | 710 m || 
|-id=073 bgcolor=#fefefe
| 584073 ||  || — || November 6, 2008 || Kitt Peak || Spacewatch || H || align=right data-sort-value="0.62" | 620 m || 
|-id=074 bgcolor=#E9E9E9
| 584074 ||  || — || July 13, 2016 || Haleakala || Pan-STARRS ||  || align=right | 1.9 km || 
|-id=075 bgcolor=#d6d6d6
| 584075 ||  || — || June 26, 2011 || Mount Lemmon || Mount Lemmon Survey ||  || align=right | 1.9 km || 
|-id=076 bgcolor=#d6d6d6
| 584076 ||  || — || February 13, 2008 || Kitt Peak || Spacewatch ||  || align=right | 2.8 km || 
|-id=077 bgcolor=#E9E9E9
| 584077 ||  || — || December 16, 2004 || Kitt Peak || Spacewatch ||  || align=right | 2.0 km || 
|-id=078 bgcolor=#d6d6d6
| 584078 ||  || — || October 24, 2011 || Haleakala || Pan-STARRS ||  || align=right | 2.4 km || 
|-id=079 bgcolor=#d6d6d6
| 584079 ||  || — || September 19, 2011 || Haleakala || Pan-STARRS ||  || align=right | 2.2 km || 
|-id=080 bgcolor=#d6d6d6
| 584080 ||  || — || October 21, 2011 || Kitt Peak || Spacewatch ||  || align=right | 2.3 km || 
|-id=081 bgcolor=#d6d6d6
| 584081 ||  || — || October 5, 2005 || Catalina || CSS ||  || align=right | 2.8 km || 
|-id=082 bgcolor=#d6d6d6
| 584082 ||  || — || October 28, 2011 || Mount Lemmon || Mount Lemmon Survey ||  || align=right | 2.4 km || 
|-id=083 bgcolor=#d6d6d6
| 584083 ||  || — || August 16, 2016 || Haleakala || Pan-STARRS ||  || align=right | 2.8 km || 
|-id=084 bgcolor=#d6d6d6
| 584084 ||  || — || October 31, 2011 || Mayhill-ISON || L. Elenin ||  || align=right | 2.7 km || 
|-id=085 bgcolor=#fefefe
| 584085 ||  || — || November 9, 2013 || Haleakala || Pan-STARRS ||  || align=right data-sort-value="0.52" | 520 m || 
|-id=086 bgcolor=#d6d6d6
| 584086 ||  || — || August 31, 2005 || Kitt Peak || Spacewatch ||  || align=right | 2.4 km || 
|-id=087 bgcolor=#d6d6d6
| 584087 ||  || — || January 25, 2015 || Haleakala || Pan-STARRS ||  || align=right | 2.8 km || 
|-id=088 bgcolor=#d6d6d6
| 584088 ||  || — || March 13, 2008 || Kitt Peak || Spacewatch ||  || align=right | 2.9 km || 
|-id=089 bgcolor=#d6d6d6
| 584089 ||  || — || December 22, 2012 || Haleakala || Pan-STARRS ||  || align=right | 2.6 km || 
|-id=090 bgcolor=#fefefe
| 584090 ||  || — || September 4, 2016 || Mount Lemmon || Mount Lemmon Survey ||  || align=right data-sort-value="0.71" | 710 m || 
|-id=091 bgcolor=#d6d6d6
| 584091 ||  || — || August 2, 2016 || Haleakala || Pan-STARRS ||  || align=right | 2.6 km || 
|-id=092 bgcolor=#d6d6d6
| 584092 ||  || — || October 3, 2006 || Mount Lemmon || Mount Lemmon Survey ||  || align=right | 2.1 km || 
|-id=093 bgcolor=#d6d6d6
| 584093 ||  || — || May 25, 2015 || Haleakala || Pan-STARRS ||  || align=right | 2.5 km || 
|-id=094 bgcolor=#d6d6d6
| 584094 ||  || — || April 21, 2009 || Kitt Peak || Spacewatch ||  || align=right | 2.3 km || 
|-id=095 bgcolor=#d6d6d6
| 584095 ||  || — || September 14, 2005 || Kitt Peak || Spacewatch ||  || align=right | 2.4 km || 
|-id=096 bgcolor=#d6d6d6
| 584096 ||  || — || September 23, 2011 || Haleakala || Pan-STARRS ||  || align=right | 2.3 km || 
|-id=097 bgcolor=#fefefe
| 584097 ||  || — || November 16, 2009 || Mount Lemmon || Mount Lemmon Survey ||  || align=right data-sort-value="0.59" | 590 m || 
|-id=098 bgcolor=#d6d6d6
| 584098 ||  || — || February 28, 2008 || Mount Lemmon || Mount Lemmon Survey ||  || align=right | 2.9 km || 
|-id=099 bgcolor=#d6d6d6
| 584099 ||  || — || September 18, 2011 || Mount Lemmon || Mount Lemmon Survey ||  || align=right | 2.6 km || 
|-id=100 bgcolor=#d6d6d6
| 584100 ||  || — || September 19, 2003 || Kitt Peak || Spacewatch || 7:4 || align=right | 2.8 km || 
|}

584101–584200 

|-bgcolor=#d6d6d6
| 584101 ||  || — || May 21, 2015 || Haleakala || Pan-STARRS ||  || align=right | 2.7 km || 
|-id=102 bgcolor=#d6d6d6
| 584102 ||  || — || August 12, 2010 || Kitt Peak || Spacewatch ||  || align=right | 2.8 km || 
|-id=103 bgcolor=#d6d6d6
| 584103 ||  || — || May 16, 2009 || Kitt Peak || Spacewatch ||  || align=right | 3.3 km || 
|-id=104 bgcolor=#d6d6d6
| 584104 ||  || — || July 24, 2015 || Haleakala || Pan-STARRS ||  || align=right | 2.3 km || 
|-id=105 bgcolor=#d6d6d6
| 584105 ||  || — || August 5, 2005 || Palomar || NEAT ||  || align=right | 3.3 km || 
|-id=106 bgcolor=#d6d6d6
| 584106 ||  || — || October 21, 2011 || Mount Lemmon || Mount Lemmon Survey ||  || align=right | 2.0 km || 
|-id=107 bgcolor=#d6d6d6
| 584107 ||  || — || April 25, 2015 || Haleakala || Pan-STARRS ||  || align=right | 2.8 km || 
|-id=108 bgcolor=#d6d6d6
| 584108 ||  || — || September 23, 2011 || Kitt Peak || Spacewatch ||  || align=right | 2.3 km || 
|-id=109 bgcolor=#fefefe
| 584109 ||  || — || March 20, 2007 || Catalina || CSS || H || align=right data-sort-value="0.65" | 650 m || 
|-id=110 bgcolor=#d6d6d6
| 584110 ||  || — || November 29, 2011 || Kitt Peak || Spacewatch ||  || align=right | 2.4 km || 
|-id=111 bgcolor=#E9E9E9
| 584111 ||  || — || April 18, 2015 || Haleakala || Pan-STARRS ||  || align=right | 1.1 km || 
|-id=112 bgcolor=#d6d6d6
| 584112 ||  || — || August 2, 2016 || Haleakala || Pan-STARRS ||  || align=right | 2.7 km || 
|-id=113 bgcolor=#d6d6d6
| 584113 ||  || — || March 24, 2014 || Haleakala || Pan-STARRS ||  || align=right | 2.2 km || 
|-id=114 bgcolor=#d6d6d6
| 584114 ||  || — || August 19, 2006 || Kitt Peak || Spacewatch ||  || align=right | 1.8 km || 
|-id=115 bgcolor=#fefefe
| 584115 ||  || — || March 21, 2015 || Haleakala || Pan-STARRS ||  || align=right data-sort-value="0.86" | 860 m || 
|-id=116 bgcolor=#d6d6d6
| 584116 ||  || — || June 7, 2015 || Mount Lemmon || Mount Lemmon Survey ||  || align=right | 2.2 km || 
|-id=117 bgcolor=#E9E9E9
| 584117 ||  || — || August 27, 2016 || Haleakala || Pan-STARRS ||  || align=right data-sort-value="0.90" | 900 m || 
|-id=118 bgcolor=#d6d6d6
| 584118 ||  || — || February 26, 2014 || Haleakala || Pan-STARRS ||  || align=right | 2.5 km || 
|-id=119 bgcolor=#d6d6d6
| 584119 ||  || — || September 12, 2005 || Kitt Peak || Spacewatch ||  || align=right | 1.7 km || 
|-id=120 bgcolor=#E9E9E9
| 584120 ||  || — || October 13, 2007 || Mount Lemmon || Mount Lemmon Survey ||  || align=right | 1.7 km || 
|-id=121 bgcolor=#d6d6d6
| 584121 ||  || — || November 22, 2011 || Catalina || CSS ||  || align=right | 2.4 km || 
|-id=122 bgcolor=#d6d6d6
| 584122 ||  || — || February 10, 2013 || Haleakala || Pan-STARRS ||  || align=right | 2.6 km || 
|-id=123 bgcolor=#d6d6d6
| 584123 ||  || — || September 27, 2016 || Haleakala || Pan-STARRS ||  || align=right | 2.6 km || 
|-id=124 bgcolor=#d6d6d6
| 584124 ||  || — || September 26, 2005 || Kitt Peak || Spacewatch ||  || align=right | 2.3 km || 
|-id=125 bgcolor=#d6d6d6
| 584125 ||  || — || August 27, 2005 || Palomar || NEAT ||  || align=right | 2.5 km || 
|-id=126 bgcolor=#fefefe
| 584126 ||  || — || April 18, 2015 || Haleakala || Pan-STARRS ||  || align=right | 1.0 km || 
|-id=127 bgcolor=#d6d6d6
| 584127 ||  || — || April 22, 2009 || Mount Lemmon || Mount Lemmon Survey ||  || align=right | 2.4 km || 
|-id=128 bgcolor=#d6d6d6
| 584128 ||  || — || April 5, 2014 || Haleakala || Pan-STARRS ||  || align=right | 2.6 km || 
|-id=129 bgcolor=#d6d6d6
| 584129 ||  || — || February 8, 2013 || Haleakala || Pan-STARRS ||  || align=right | 2.6 km || 
|-id=130 bgcolor=#d6d6d6
| 584130 ||  || — || October 24, 2011 || Haleakala || Pan-STARRS ||  || align=right | 2.8 km || 
|-id=131 bgcolor=#d6d6d6
| 584131 ||  || — || July 30, 2005 || Palomar || NEAT ||  || align=right | 2.2 km || 
|-id=132 bgcolor=#E9E9E9
| 584132 ||  || — || June 12, 2015 || Haleakala || Pan-STARRS ||  || align=right | 1.4 km || 
|-id=133 bgcolor=#d6d6d6
| 584133 ||  || — || September 30, 2016 || Haleakala || Pan-STARRS ||  || align=right | 2.7 km || 
|-id=134 bgcolor=#d6d6d6
| 584134 ||  || — || September 22, 2016 || Mount Lemmon || Mount Lemmon Survey ||  || align=right | 2.3 km || 
|-id=135 bgcolor=#d6d6d6
| 584135 ||  || — || September 27, 2016 || Haleakala || Pan-STARRS ||  || align=right | 2.8 km || 
|-id=136 bgcolor=#d6d6d6
| 584136 ||  || — || September 25, 2016 || Haleakala || Pan-STARRS ||  || align=right | 2.4 km || 
|-id=137 bgcolor=#d6d6d6
| 584137 ||  || — || January 18, 2013 || Mount Lemmon || Mount Lemmon Survey ||  || align=right | 2.8 km || 
|-id=138 bgcolor=#d6d6d6
| 584138 ||  || — || August 28, 2005 || Siding Spring || SSS ||  || align=right | 3.1 km || 
|-id=139 bgcolor=#E9E9E9
| 584139 ||  || — || November 14, 2003 || Palomar || NEAT ||  || align=right | 3.0 km || 
|-id=140 bgcolor=#d6d6d6
| 584140 ||  || — || September 18, 2010 || Kitt Peak || Spacewatch ||  || align=right | 3.6 km || 
|-id=141 bgcolor=#d6d6d6
| 584141 ||  || — || October 23, 2011 || Haleakala || Pan-STARRS ||  || align=right | 2.5 km || 
|-id=142 bgcolor=#d6d6d6
| 584142 ||  || — || September 16, 2010 || Mount Lemmon || Mount Lemmon Survey || Tj (2.94) || align=right | 2.5 km || 
|-id=143 bgcolor=#d6d6d6
| 584143 ||  || — || February 25, 2007 || Kitt Peak || Spacewatch ||  || align=right | 2.9 km || 
|-id=144 bgcolor=#d6d6d6
| 584144 ||  || — || May 7, 2014 || Haleakala || Pan-STARRS ||  || align=right | 3.2 km || 
|-id=145 bgcolor=#d6d6d6
| 584145 ||  || — || October 17, 2011 || Kitt Peak || Spacewatch ||  || align=right | 2.5 km || 
|-id=146 bgcolor=#E9E9E9
| 584146 ||  || — || December 30, 2008 || Mount Lemmon || Mount Lemmon Survey ||  || align=right | 1.5 km || 
|-id=147 bgcolor=#fefefe
| 584147 ||  || — || November 28, 2014 || Haleakala || Pan-STARRS || H || align=right data-sort-value="0.75" | 750 m || 
|-id=148 bgcolor=#d6d6d6
| 584148 ||  || — || October 5, 2011 || Piszkesteto || K. Sárneczky ||  || align=right | 2.2 km || 
|-id=149 bgcolor=#d6d6d6
| 584149 ||  || — || June 17, 2005 || Mount Lemmon || Mount Lemmon Survey ||  || align=right | 3.0 km || 
|-id=150 bgcolor=#fefefe
| 584150 ||  || — || October 25, 2005 || Catalina || CSS || H || align=right data-sort-value="0.73" | 730 m || 
|-id=151 bgcolor=#d6d6d6
| 584151 ||  || — || September 27, 2016 || Mount Lemmon || Mount Lemmon Survey ||  || align=right | 2.3 km || 
|-id=152 bgcolor=#fefefe
| 584152 ||  || — || February 20, 2015 || Haleakala || Pan-STARRS || H || align=right data-sort-value="0.52" | 520 m || 
|-id=153 bgcolor=#d6d6d6
| 584153 ||  || — || January 19, 2008 || Mount Lemmon || Mount Lemmon Survey ||  || align=right | 2.9 km || 
|-id=154 bgcolor=#d6d6d6
| 584154 ||  || — || May 19, 2015 || Mount Lemmon || Mount Lemmon Survey ||  || align=right | 1.9 km || 
|-id=155 bgcolor=#d6d6d6
| 584155 ||  || — || March 30, 2008 || Kitt Peak || Spacewatch ||  || align=right | 2.9 km || 
|-id=156 bgcolor=#d6d6d6
| 584156 ||  || — || August 31, 2005 || Kitt Peak || Spacewatch ||  || align=right | 2.6 km || 
|-id=157 bgcolor=#d6d6d6
| 584157 ||  || — || April 23, 2014 || Haleakala || Pan-STARRS ||  || align=right | 2.8 km || 
|-id=158 bgcolor=#d6d6d6
| 584158 ||  || — || November 1, 2005 || Kitt Peak || Spacewatch ||  || align=right | 2.6 km || 
|-id=159 bgcolor=#d6d6d6
| 584159 ||  || — || September 1, 2005 || Kitt Peak || Spacewatch ||  || align=right | 2.2 km || 
|-id=160 bgcolor=#fefefe
| 584160 ||  || — || March 28, 2015 || Haleakala || Pan-STARRS ||  || align=right data-sort-value="0.70" | 700 m || 
|-id=161 bgcolor=#d6d6d6
| 584161 ||  || — || September 27, 2016 || Mount Lemmon || Mount Lemmon Survey ||  || align=right | 3.5 km || 
|-id=162 bgcolor=#d6d6d6
| 584162 ||  || — || September 1, 2005 || Palomar || NEAT ||  || align=right | 3.5 km || 
|-id=163 bgcolor=#d6d6d6
| 584163 ||  || — || January 14, 2002 || Kitt Peak || Spacewatch ||  || align=right | 3.2 km || 
|-id=164 bgcolor=#fefefe
| 584164 ||  || — || July 18, 2012 || Catalina || CSS ||  || align=right data-sort-value="0.94" | 940 m || 
|-id=165 bgcolor=#E9E9E9
| 584165 ||  || — || October 1, 2016 || Mount Lemmon || Mount Lemmon Survey ||  || align=right | 2.0 km || 
|-id=166 bgcolor=#d6d6d6
| 584166 ||  || — || November 24, 2011 || Mount Lemmon || Mount Lemmon Survey ||  || align=right | 3.0 km || 
|-id=167 bgcolor=#d6d6d6
| 584167 ||  || — || September 27, 2011 || Mount Lemmon || Mount Lemmon Survey ||  || align=right | 2.2 km || 
|-id=168 bgcolor=#d6d6d6
| 584168 ||  || — || October 20, 2011 || Kitt Peak || Spacewatch ||  || align=right | 2.0 km || 
|-id=169 bgcolor=#d6d6d6
| 584169 ||  || — || October 24, 2011 || Haleakala || Pan-STARRS ||  || align=right | 2.1 km || 
|-id=170 bgcolor=#d6d6d6
| 584170 ||  || — || September 5, 2016 || Mount Lemmon || Mount Lemmon Survey ||  || align=right | 2.6 km || 
|-id=171 bgcolor=#E9E9E9
| 584171 ||  || — || December 2, 2005 || Mauna Kea || Mauna Kea Obs. ||  || align=right | 1.5 km || 
|-id=172 bgcolor=#d6d6d6
| 584172 ||  || — || October 21, 2011 || Kitt Peak || Spacewatch ||  || align=right | 2.4 km || 
|-id=173 bgcolor=#d6d6d6
| 584173 ||  || — || September 14, 2005 || Kitt Peak || Spacewatch ||  || align=right | 2.8 km || 
|-id=174 bgcolor=#d6d6d6
| 584174 ||  || — || May 10, 2003 || Kitt Peak || Spacewatch ||  || align=right | 2.6 km || 
|-id=175 bgcolor=#d6d6d6
| 584175 ||  || — || March 13, 2008 || Kitt Peak || Spacewatch ||  || align=right | 2.5 km || 
|-id=176 bgcolor=#d6d6d6
| 584176 ||  || — || September 29, 1995 || Kitt Peak || Spacewatch ||  || align=right | 1.7 km || 
|-id=177 bgcolor=#d6d6d6
| 584177 ||  || — || September 8, 2000 || Kitt Peak || Spacewatch ||  || align=right | 2.5 km || 
|-id=178 bgcolor=#E9E9E9
| 584178 ||  || — || April 9, 2015 || Mount Lemmon || Mount Lemmon Survey ||  || align=right data-sort-value="0.82" | 820 m || 
|-id=179 bgcolor=#d6d6d6
| 584179 ||  || — || May 13, 2009 || Kitt Peak || Spacewatch ||  || align=right | 2.5 km || 
|-id=180 bgcolor=#d6d6d6
| 584180 ||  || — || September 29, 2010 || Mount Lemmon || Mount Lemmon Survey ||  || align=right | 2.7 km || 
|-id=181 bgcolor=#fefefe
| 584181 ||  || — || September 20, 2009 || Kitt Peak || Spacewatch ||  || align=right data-sort-value="0.41" | 410 m || 
|-id=182 bgcolor=#d6d6d6
| 584182 ||  || — || October 1, 2005 || Mount Lemmon || Mount Lemmon Survey ||  || align=right | 3.0 km || 
|-id=183 bgcolor=#d6d6d6
| 584183 ||  || — || November 23, 2011 || XuYi || PMO NEO ||  || align=right | 3.2 km || 
|-id=184 bgcolor=#d6d6d6
| 584184 ||  || — || October 7, 2016 || Haleakala || Pan-STARRS ||  || align=right | 2.2 km || 
|-id=185 bgcolor=#d6d6d6
| 584185 ||  || — || June 1, 2009 || Mount Lemmon || Mount Lemmon Survey ||  || align=right | 2.5 km || 
|-id=186 bgcolor=#d6d6d6
| 584186 ||  || — || August 4, 2016 || Haleakala || Pan-STARRS ||  || align=right | 2.7 km || 
|-id=187 bgcolor=#d6d6d6
| 584187 ||  || — || August 29, 2016 || Mount Lemmon || Mount Lemmon Survey ||  || align=right | 2.3 km || 
|-id=188 bgcolor=#fefefe
| 584188 ||  || — || October 27, 2008 || Siding Spring || SSS || H || align=right data-sort-value="0.98" | 980 m || 
|-id=189 bgcolor=#d6d6d6
| 584189 ||  || — || December 14, 2006 || Kitt Peak || Spacewatch ||  || align=right | 3.4 km || 
|-id=190 bgcolor=#E9E9E9
| 584190 ||  || — || October 24, 2008 || Kitt Peak || Spacewatch ||  || align=right | 1.5 km || 
|-id=191 bgcolor=#d6d6d6
| 584191 ||  || — || November 22, 2006 || Mount Lemmon || Mount Lemmon Survey ||  || align=right | 2.5 km || 
|-id=192 bgcolor=#d6d6d6
| 584192 ||  || — || September 6, 2010 || Mount Lemmon || Mount Lemmon Survey ||  || align=right | 3.5 km || 
|-id=193 bgcolor=#d6d6d6
| 584193 ||  || — || September 14, 2005 || Kitt Peak || Spacewatch ||  || align=right | 2.4 km || 
|-id=194 bgcolor=#E9E9E9
| 584194 ||  || — || August 27, 2011 || Haleakala || Pan-STARRS ||  || align=right | 2.1 km || 
|-id=195 bgcolor=#d6d6d6
| 584195 ||  || — || February 28, 2014 || Haleakala || Pan-STARRS ||  || align=right | 2.5 km || 
|-id=196 bgcolor=#d6d6d6
| 584196 ||  || — || July 19, 2015 || Haleakala || Pan-STARRS ||  || align=right | 2.5 km || 
|-id=197 bgcolor=#d6d6d6
| 584197 ||  || — || October 7, 2016 || Haleakala || Pan-STARRS ||  || align=right | 3.4 km || 
|-id=198 bgcolor=#d6d6d6
| 584198 ||  || — || November 22, 2006 || Mount Lemmon || Mount Lemmon Survey ||  || align=right | 3.5 km || 
|-id=199 bgcolor=#d6d6d6
| 584199 ||  || — || August 5, 2010 || Sandlot || G. Hug ||  || align=right | 2.4 km || 
|-id=200 bgcolor=#d6d6d6
| 584200 ||  || — || June 13, 2010 || Mount Lemmon || Mount Lemmon Survey ||  || align=right | 2.4 km || 
|}

584201–584300 

|-bgcolor=#d6d6d6
| 584201 ||  || — || October 31, 2011 || Mount Lemmon || Mount Lemmon Survey ||  || align=right | 2.1 km || 
|-id=202 bgcolor=#FA8072
| 584202 ||  || — || September 19, 2003 || Kitt Peak || Spacewatch ||  || align=right data-sort-value="0.62" | 620 m || 
|-id=203 bgcolor=#d6d6d6
| 584203 ||  || — || October 18, 2011 || Haleakala || Pan-STARRS ||  || align=right | 2.1 km || 
|-id=204 bgcolor=#d6d6d6
| 584204 ||  || — || October 25, 2011 || Haleakala || Pan-STARRS ||  || align=right | 3.0 km || 
|-id=205 bgcolor=#d6d6d6
| 584205 ||  || — || September 18, 2010 || Mount Lemmon || Mount Lemmon Survey ||  || align=right | 2.9 km || 
|-id=206 bgcolor=#d6d6d6
| 584206 ||  || — || December 5, 2005 || Mount Lemmon || Mount Lemmon Survey ||  || align=right | 2.2 km || 
|-id=207 bgcolor=#d6d6d6
| 584207 ||  || — || August 13, 2010 || Kitt Peak || Spacewatch ||  || align=right | 2.2 km || 
|-id=208 bgcolor=#E9E9E9
| 584208 ||  || — || October 20, 2003 || Kitt Peak || Spacewatch ||  || align=right | 1.4 km || 
|-id=209 bgcolor=#d6d6d6
| 584209 ||  || — || April 3, 2008 || Mount Lemmon || Mount Lemmon Survey ||  || align=right | 2.6 km || 
|-id=210 bgcolor=#d6d6d6
| 584210 ||  || — || September 24, 2011 || Haleakala || Pan-STARRS ||  || align=right | 2.6 km || 
|-id=211 bgcolor=#d6d6d6
| 584211 ||  || — || August 19, 2010 || XuYi || PMO NEO ||  || align=right | 3.3 km || 
|-id=212 bgcolor=#E9E9E9
| 584212 ||  || — || October 9, 2012 || Haleakala || Pan-STARRS ||  || align=right | 1.2 km || 
|-id=213 bgcolor=#E9E9E9
| 584213 ||  || — || September 5, 2007 || Anderson Mesa || LONEOS ||  || align=right | 1.7 km || 
|-id=214 bgcolor=#E9E9E9
| 584214 ||  || — || October 21, 2012 || Haleakala || Pan-STARRS ||  || align=right data-sort-value="0.75" | 750 m || 
|-id=215 bgcolor=#fefefe
| 584215 ||  || — || January 4, 2012 || Mount Lemmon || Mount Lemmon Survey || H || align=right data-sort-value="0.65" | 650 m || 
|-id=216 bgcolor=#fefefe
| 584216 ||  || — || August 15, 2013 || Haleakala || Pan-STARRS || H || align=right data-sort-value="0.46" | 460 m || 
|-id=217 bgcolor=#E9E9E9
| 584217 ||  || — || October 5, 2016 || Mount Lemmon || Mount Lemmon Survey ||  || align=right | 1.6 km || 
|-id=218 bgcolor=#d6d6d6
| 584218 ||  || — || September 3, 2005 || Palomar || NEAT ||  || align=right | 2.7 km || 
|-id=219 bgcolor=#d6d6d6
| 584219 ||  || — || December 31, 2000 || Haleakala || AMOS ||  || align=right | 3.7 km || 
|-id=220 bgcolor=#d6d6d6
| 584220 ||  || — || February 14, 2013 || Haleakala || Pan-STARRS ||  || align=right | 2.6 km || 
|-id=221 bgcolor=#d6d6d6
| 584221 ||  || — || May 4, 2014 || Mount Lemmon || Mount Lemmon Survey ||  || align=right | 2.7 km || 
|-id=222 bgcolor=#d6d6d6
| 584222 ||  || — || September 5, 2010 || Ondrejov || Ondřejov Obs. ||  || align=right | 3.1 km || 
|-id=223 bgcolor=#d6d6d6
| 584223 ||  || — || October 9, 2016 || Haleakala || Pan-STARRS ||  || align=right | 2.7 km || 
|-id=224 bgcolor=#E9E9E9
| 584224 ||  || — || October 13, 2016 || Haleakala || Pan-STARRS ||  || align=right | 1.5 km || 
|-id=225 bgcolor=#E9E9E9
| 584225 ||  || — || October 13, 2016 || Haleakala || Pan-STARRS ||  || align=right | 1.5 km || 
|-id=226 bgcolor=#fefefe
| 584226 ||  || — || October 7, 2016 || Haleakala || Pan-STARRS ||  || align=right data-sort-value="0.68" | 680 m || 
|-id=227 bgcolor=#d6d6d6
| 584227 ||  || — || October 12, 2016 || Haleakala || Pan-STARRS ||  || align=right | 1.9 km || 
|-id=228 bgcolor=#d6d6d6
| 584228 ||  || — || October 7, 2016 || Kitt Peak || Spacewatch ||  || align=right | 2.5 km || 
|-id=229 bgcolor=#d6d6d6
| 584229 ||  || — || October 2, 2016 || Mount Lemmon || Mount Lemmon Survey ||  || align=right | 2.5 km || 
|-id=230 bgcolor=#d6d6d6
| 584230 ||  || — || October 12, 2016 || Haleakala || Pan-STARRS ||  || align=right | 2.4 km || 
|-id=231 bgcolor=#d6d6d6
| 584231 ||  || — || October 12, 2016 || Haleakala || Pan-STARRS ||  || align=right | 2.0 km || 
|-id=232 bgcolor=#E9E9E9
| 584232 ||  || — || October 10, 2016 || Haleakala || Pan-STARRS ||  || align=right | 1.4 km || 
|-id=233 bgcolor=#d6d6d6
| 584233 ||  || — || November 16, 2000 || Anderson Mesa || LONEOS ||  || align=right | 2.4 km || 
|-id=234 bgcolor=#d6d6d6
| 584234 ||  || — || May 26, 2003 || Kitt Peak || Spacewatch ||  || align=right | 3.0 km || 
|-id=235 bgcolor=#d6d6d6
| 584235 ||  || — || May 29, 2003 || Cerro Tololo || M. W. Buie, K. J. Meech ||  || align=right | 3.0 km || 
|-id=236 bgcolor=#d6d6d6
| 584236 ||  || — || October 25, 2011 || Haleakala || Pan-STARRS ||  || align=right | 2.8 km || 
|-id=237 bgcolor=#d6d6d6
| 584237 ||  || — || November 26, 2011 || Kitt Peak || Spacewatch ||  || align=right | 3.2 km || 
|-id=238 bgcolor=#d6d6d6
| 584238 ||  || — || September 2, 2010 || Mount Lemmon || Mount Lemmon Survey ||  || align=right | 3.1 km || 
|-id=239 bgcolor=#fefefe
| 584239 ||  || — || November 26, 2014 || Haleakala || Pan-STARRS || H || align=right data-sort-value="0.83" | 830 m || 
|-id=240 bgcolor=#fefefe
| 584240 ||  || — || March 17, 2010 || Kitt Peak || Spacewatch || H || align=right data-sort-value="0.56" | 560 m || 
|-id=241 bgcolor=#d6d6d6
| 584241 ||  || — || August 25, 2005 || Palomar || NEAT ||  || align=right | 2.7 km || 
|-id=242 bgcolor=#E9E9E9
| 584242 ||  || — || March 17, 2005 || Mount Lemmon || Mount Lemmon Survey ||  || align=right | 1.5 km || 
|-id=243 bgcolor=#d6d6d6
| 584243 ||  || — || November 15, 2011 || Kitt Peak || Spacewatch ||  || align=right | 1.8 km || 
|-id=244 bgcolor=#d6d6d6
| 584244 ||  || — || March 8, 2013 || Haleakala || Pan-STARRS ||  || align=right | 2.6 km || 
|-id=245 bgcolor=#d6d6d6
| 584245 ||  || — || October 10, 2005 || Kitt Peak || Spacewatch ||  || align=right | 2.5 km || 
|-id=246 bgcolor=#d6d6d6
| 584246 ||  || — || August 15, 2004 || Campo Imperatore || CINEOS ||  || align=right | 3.2 km || 
|-id=247 bgcolor=#d6d6d6
| 584247 ||  || — || August 13, 2010 || Kitt Peak || Spacewatch ||  || align=right | 2.6 km || 
|-id=248 bgcolor=#d6d6d6
| 584248 ||  || — || September 30, 2005 || Mount Lemmon || Mount Lemmon Survey ||  || align=right | 2.3 km || 
|-id=249 bgcolor=#fefefe
| 584249 ||  || — || January 18, 2015 || Haleakala || Pan-STARRS || H || align=right data-sort-value="0.82" | 820 m || 
|-id=250 bgcolor=#d6d6d6
| 584250 ||  || — || October 9, 1999 || Socorro || LINEAR ||  || align=right | 2.7 km || 
|-id=251 bgcolor=#d6d6d6
| 584251 ||  || — || January 2, 2012 || Mount Lemmon || Mount Lemmon Survey ||  || align=right | 2.9 km || 
|-id=252 bgcolor=#d6d6d6
| 584252 ||  || — || January 4, 2013 || Cerro Tololo-DECam || CTIO-DECam ||  || align=right | 2.7 km || 
|-id=253 bgcolor=#E9E9E9
| 584253 ||  || — || July 17, 2016 || Haleakala || Pan-STARRS ||  || align=right | 1.1 km || 
|-id=254 bgcolor=#d6d6d6
| 584254 ||  || — || October 26, 2011 || Haleakala || Pan-STARRS ||  || align=right | 2.4 km || 
|-id=255 bgcolor=#d6d6d6
| 584255 ||  || — || October 28, 2005 || Catalina || CSS ||  || align=right | 3.1 km || 
|-id=256 bgcolor=#d6d6d6
| 584256 ||  || — || November 3, 2011 || Mount Lemmon || Mount Lemmon Survey ||  || align=right | 3.0 km || 
|-id=257 bgcolor=#d6d6d6
| 584257 ||  || — || January 5, 2013 || Mount Lemmon || Mount Lemmon Survey ||  || align=right | 2.7 km || 
|-id=258 bgcolor=#d6d6d6
| 584258 ||  || — || October 3, 2011 || Piszkesteto || K. Sárneczky ||  || align=right | 3.0 km || 
|-id=259 bgcolor=#d6d6d6
| 584259 ||  || — || April 4, 2003 || Kitt Peak || Spacewatch ||  || align=right | 2.8 km || 
|-id=260 bgcolor=#d6d6d6
| 584260 ||  || — || January 20, 2013 || Kitt Peak || Spacewatch ||  || align=right | 2.7 km || 
|-id=261 bgcolor=#d6d6d6
| 584261 ||  || — || September 26, 2005 || Kitt Peak || Spacewatch ||  || align=right | 2.8 km || 
|-id=262 bgcolor=#d6d6d6
| 584262 ||  || — || October 24, 2005 || Kitt Peak || Spacewatch ||  || align=right | 2.0 km || 
|-id=263 bgcolor=#d6d6d6
| 584263 ||  || — || March 6, 2008 || Mount Lemmon || Mount Lemmon Survey ||  || align=right | 2.3 km || 
|-id=264 bgcolor=#d6d6d6
| 584264 ||  || — || September 11, 2016 || Mount Lemmon || Mount Lemmon Survey ||  || align=right | 2.7 km || 
|-id=265 bgcolor=#d6d6d6
| 584265 ||  || — || October 13, 2016 || Haleakala || Pan-STARRS ||  || align=right | 3.1 km || 
|-id=266 bgcolor=#d6d6d6
| 584266 ||  || — || September 20, 2006 || Kitt Peak || Spacewatch ||  || align=right | 1.9 km || 
|-id=267 bgcolor=#d6d6d6
| 584267 ||  || — || March 8, 2014 || Mount Lemmon || Mount Lemmon Survey ||  || align=right | 2.7 km || 
|-id=268 bgcolor=#d6d6d6
| 584268 ||  || — || August 30, 2005 || Palomar || NEAT ||  || align=right | 3.7 km || 
|-id=269 bgcolor=#d6d6d6
| 584269 ||  || — || September 1, 2005 || Palomar || NEAT ||  || align=right | 2.8 km || 
|-id=270 bgcolor=#d6d6d6
| 584270 ||  || — || September 11, 2010 || Kitt Peak || Spacewatch ||  || align=right | 2.2 km || 
|-id=271 bgcolor=#fefefe
| 584271 ||  || — || September 28, 2003 || Kitt Peak || Spacewatch || H || align=right data-sort-value="0.55" | 550 m || 
|-id=272 bgcolor=#E9E9E9
| 584272 ||  || — || November 24, 2003 || Kitt Peak || Spacewatch ||  || align=right | 2.0 km || 
|-id=273 bgcolor=#E9E9E9
| 584273 ||  || — || August 10, 2016 || Haleakala || Pan-STARRS ||  || align=right data-sort-value="0.99" | 990 m || 
|-id=274 bgcolor=#d6d6d6
| 584274 ||  || — || August 10, 2010 || Kitt Peak || Spacewatch ||  || align=right | 2.9 km || 
|-id=275 bgcolor=#d6d6d6
| 584275 ||  || — || April 5, 2014 || Haleakala || Pan-STARRS ||  || align=right | 2.7 km || 
|-id=276 bgcolor=#E9E9E9
| 584276 ||  || — || November 24, 2008 || Kitt Peak || Spacewatch ||  || align=right data-sort-value="0.90" | 900 m || 
|-id=277 bgcolor=#d6d6d6
| 584277 ||  || — || October 26, 2016 || Mount Lemmon || Mount Lemmon Survey ||  || align=right | 2.8 km || 
|-id=278 bgcolor=#d6d6d6
| 584278 ||  || — || October 19, 2011 || Kitt Peak || Spacewatch ||  || align=right | 2.2 km || 
|-id=279 bgcolor=#E9E9E9
| 584279 ||  || — || November 13, 2007 || Kitt Peak || Spacewatch ||  || align=right | 2.1 km || 
|-id=280 bgcolor=#d6d6d6
| 584280 ||  || — || November 4, 2005 || Mount Lemmon || Mount Lemmon Survey ||  || align=right | 2.4 km || 
|-id=281 bgcolor=#d6d6d6
| 584281 ||  || — || October 29, 2005 || Mount Lemmon || Mount Lemmon Survey ||  || align=right | 2.5 km || 
|-id=282 bgcolor=#d6d6d6
| 584282 ||  || — || September 18, 2010 || Mount Lemmon || Mount Lemmon Survey ||  || align=right | 2.6 km || 
|-id=283 bgcolor=#E9E9E9
| 584283 ||  || — || December 22, 2008 || Kitt Peak || Spacewatch ||  || align=right | 1.5 km || 
|-id=284 bgcolor=#d6d6d6
| 584284 ||  || — || October 11, 2010 || Kitt Peak || Spacewatch ||  || align=right | 2.8 km || 
|-id=285 bgcolor=#fefefe
| 584285 ||  || — || October 16, 2001 || Cima Ekar || C. Barbieri, G. Pignata ||  || align=right data-sort-value="0.75" | 750 m || 
|-id=286 bgcolor=#d6d6d6
| 584286 ||  || — || November 6, 2005 || Kitt Peak || Spacewatch ||  || align=right | 2.6 km || 
|-id=287 bgcolor=#d6d6d6
| 584287 ||  || — || October 29, 2005 || Mount Lemmon || Mount Lemmon Survey ||  || align=right | 1.9 km || 
|-id=288 bgcolor=#d6d6d6
| 584288 ||  || — || April 6, 2008 || Kitt Peak || Spacewatch ||  || align=right | 2.4 km || 
|-id=289 bgcolor=#d6d6d6
| 584289 ||  || — || October 24, 2011 || Mount Lemmon || Mount Lemmon Survey ||  || align=right | 2.2 km || 
|-id=290 bgcolor=#d6d6d6
| 584290 ||  || — || March 5, 2008 || Mount Lemmon || Mount Lemmon Survey ||  || align=right | 2.0 km || 
|-id=291 bgcolor=#FA8072
| 584291 ||  || — || October 13, 2016 || Mount Lemmon || Mount Lemmon Survey || H || align=right data-sort-value="0.53" | 530 m || 
|-id=292 bgcolor=#d6d6d6
| 584292 ||  || — || May 1, 2014 || Mount Lemmon || Mount Lemmon Survey ||  || align=right | 2.2 km || 
|-id=293 bgcolor=#d6d6d6
| 584293 ||  || — || April 4, 2014 || Mount Lemmon || Mount Lemmon Survey ||  || align=right | 2.1 km || 
|-id=294 bgcolor=#fefefe
| 584294 ||  || — || October 30, 2016 || Mount Lemmon || Mount Lemmon Survey || H || align=right data-sort-value="0.80" | 800 m || 
|-id=295 bgcolor=#E9E9E9
| 584295 ||  || — || October 20, 2003 || Kitt Peak || Spacewatch ||  || align=right | 1.9 km || 
|-id=296 bgcolor=#d6d6d6
| 584296 ||  || — || April 5, 2014 || Haleakala || Pan-STARRS ||  || align=right | 2.3 km || 
|-id=297 bgcolor=#d6d6d6
| 584297 ||  || — || February 19, 2001 || Kitt Peak || Spacewatch ||  || align=right | 2.7 km || 
|-id=298 bgcolor=#d6d6d6
| 584298 ||  || — || October 21, 2016 || Mount Lemmon || Mount Lemmon Survey ||  || align=right | 2.6 km || 
|-id=299 bgcolor=#fefefe
| 584299 ||  || — || October 23, 2011 || Mount Lemmon || Mount Lemmon Survey || H || align=right data-sort-value="0.50" | 500 m || 
|-id=300 bgcolor=#E9E9E9
| 584300 ||  || — || June 26, 2015 || Haleakala || Pan-STARRS ||  || align=right data-sort-value="0.78" | 780 m || 
|}

584301–584400 

|-bgcolor=#d6d6d6
| 584301 ||  || — || November 6, 2005 || Mount Lemmon || Mount Lemmon Survey ||  || align=right | 2.1 km || 
|-id=302 bgcolor=#d6d6d6
| 584302 ||  || — || May 3, 2008 || Mount Lemmon || Mount Lemmon Survey ||  || align=right | 3.8 km || 
|-id=303 bgcolor=#E9E9E9
| 584303 ||  || — || May 21, 2015 || Haleakala || Pan-STARRS ||  || align=right data-sort-value="0.94" | 940 m || 
|-id=304 bgcolor=#d6d6d6
| 584304 ||  || — || October 2, 2016 || Mount Lemmon || Mount Lemmon Survey ||  || align=right | 3.0 km || 
|-id=305 bgcolor=#d6d6d6
| 584305 ||  || — || September 2, 2016 || Mount Lemmon || Mount Lemmon Survey ||  || align=right | 2.4 km || 
|-id=306 bgcolor=#d6d6d6
| 584306 ||  || — || September 12, 2005 || Kitt Peak || Spacewatch ||  || align=right | 2.5 km || 
|-id=307 bgcolor=#d6d6d6
| 584307 ||  || — || November 27, 2006 || Mount Lemmon || Mount Lemmon Survey ||  || align=right | 3.2 km || 
|-id=308 bgcolor=#E9E9E9
| 584308 ||  || — || October 20, 2016 || Mount Lemmon || Mount Lemmon Survey ||  || align=right | 1.9 km || 
|-id=309 bgcolor=#E9E9E9
| 584309 ||  || — || October 21, 2016 || Mount Lemmon || Mount Lemmon Survey ||  || align=right | 1.3 km || 
|-id=310 bgcolor=#d6d6d6
| 584310 ||  || — || October 21, 2016 || Mount Lemmon || Mount Lemmon Survey ||  || align=right | 2.4 km || 
|-id=311 bgcolor=#fefefe
| 584311 ||  || — || November 20, 2011 || Zelenchukskaya Stn || T. V. Kryachko, B. Satovski || H || align=right data-sort-value="0.72" | 720 m || 
|-id=312 bgcolor=#d6d6d6
| 584312 ||  || — || October 24, 2005 || Kitt Peak || Spacewatch ||  || align=right | 2.3 km || 
|-id=313 bgcolor=#E9E9E9
| 584313 ||  || — || April 27, 2006 || Cerro Tololo || Cerro Tololo Obs. ||  || align=right | 1.4 km || 
|-id=314 bgcolor=#d6d6d6
| 584314 ||  || — || October 4, 2004 || Socorro || LINEAR ||  || align=right | 4.8 km || 
|-id=315 bgcolor=#d6d6d6
| 584315 ||  || — || June 8, 2016 || Haleakala || Pan-STARRS ||  || align=right | 2.7 km || 
|-id=316 bgcolor=#E9E9E9
| 584316 ||  || — || November 5, 2016 || Haleakala || Pan-STARRS ||  || align=right | 1.1 km || 
|-id=317 bgcolor=#E9E9E9
| 584317 ||  || — || November 10, 2016 || Mount Lemmon || Mount Lemmon Survey ||  || align=right | 1.1 km || 
|-id=318 bgcolor=#fefefe
| 584318 ||  || — || December 3, 2008 || Mount Lemmon || Mount Lemmon Survey || H || align=right data-sort-value="0.72" | 720 m || 
|-id=319 bgcolor=#fefefe
| 584319 ||  || — || May 13, 2015 || Haleakala || Pan-STARRS || H || align=right data-sort-value="0.71" | 710 m || 
|-id=320 bgcolor=#FA8072
| 584320 ||  || — || February 6, 2002 || Kitt Peak || Spacewatch || H || align=right data-sort-value="0.56" | 560 m || 
|-id=321 bgcolor=#fefefe
| 584321 ||  || — || April 15, 2007 || Mount Lemmon || Mount Lemmon Survey || H || align=right data-sort-value="0.74" | 740 m || 
|-id=322 bgcolor=#E9E9E9
| 584322 ||  || — || December 12, 2004 || Kitt Peak || Spacewatch ||  || align=right | 1.1 km || 
|-id=323 bgcolor=#d6d6d6
| 584323 ||  || — || October 31, 2010 || Mount Lemmon || Mount Lemmon Survey ||  || align=right | 2.7 km || 
|-id=324 bgcolor=#d6d6d6
| 584324 ||  || — || October 26, 2005 || Kitt Peak || Spacewatch ||  || align=right | 2.7 km || 
|-id=325 bgcolor=#d6d6d6
| 584325 ||  || — || October 9, 2010 || Mount Lemmon || Mount Lemmon Survey ||  || align=right | 2.6 km || 
|-id=326 bgcolor=#d6d6d6
| 584326 ||  || — || October 26, 2016 || Haleakala || Pan-STARRS ||  || align=right | 2.9 km || 
|-id=327 bgcolor=#d6d6d6
| 584327 ||  || — || October 28, 2005 || Mount Lemmon || Mount Lemmon Survey ||  || align=right | 2.1 km || 
|-id=328 bgcolor=#d6d6d6
| 584328 ||  || — || January 20, 2006 || Anderson Mesa || LONEOS ||  || align=right | 2.5 km || 
|-id=329 bgcolor=#d6d6d6
| 584329 ||  || — || January 28, 2007 || Mount Lemmon || Mount Lemmon Survey ||  || align=right | 3.0 km || 
|-id=330 bgcolor=#d6d6d6
| 584330 ||  || — || September 17, 2010 || Kitt Peak || Spacewatch ||  || align=right | 2.9 km || 
|-id=331 bgcolor=#E9E9E9
| 584331 ||  || — || September 20, 2011 || Mount Lemmon || Mount Lemmon Survey ||  || align=right | 1.9 km || 
|-id=332 bgcolor=#E9E9E9
| 584332 ||  || — || November 7, 2008 || Mount Lemmon || Mount Lemmon Survey ||  || align=right | 1.2 km || 
|-id=333 bgcolor=#E9E9E9
| 584333 ||  || — || September 26, 2011 || Haleakala || Pan-STARRS ||  || align=right | 1.7 km || 
|-id=334 bgcolor=#d6d6d6
| 584334 ||  || — || January 4, 2006 || Kitt Peak || Spacewatch ||  || align=right | 2.5 km || 
|-id=335 bgcolor=#d6d6d6
| 584335 ||  || — || October 28, 2011 || Ka-Dar || V. Gerke ||  || align=right | 2.5 km || 
|-id=336 bgcolor=#d6d6d6
| 584336 ||  || — || March 15, 2013 || Catalina || CSS ||  || align=right | 3.2 km || 
|-id=337 bgcolor=#fefefe
| 584337 ||  || — || June 4, 2005 || Kitt Peak || Spacewatch || H || align=right data-sort-value="0.73" | 730 m || 
|-id=338 bgcolor=#d6d6d6
| 584338 ||  || — || September 17, 2010 || Kitt Peak || Spacewatch ||  || align=right | 2.5 km || 
|-id=339 bgcolor=#E9E9E9
| 584339 ||  || — || April 14, 2010 || Mount Lemmon || Mount Lemmon Survey ||  || align=right | 1.5 km || 
|-id=340 bgcolor=#d6d6d6
| 584340 ||  || — || June 29, 2015 || Haleakala || Pan-STARRS ||  || align=right | 2.5 km || 
|-id=341 bgcolor=#fefefe
| 584341 ||  || — || December 5, 2016 || Mount Lemmon || Mount Lemmon Survey || H || align=right data-sort-value="0.59" | 590 m || 
|-id=342 bgcolor=#d6d6d6
| 584342 ||  || — || October 11, 1999 || Kitt Peak || Spacewatch ||  || align=right | 2.6 km || 
|-id=343 bgcolor=#fefefe
| 584343 ||  || — || November 14, 2002 || Palomar || NEAT || H || align=right data-sort-value="0.77" | 770 m || 
|-id=344 bgcolor=#fefefe
| 584344 ||  || — || July 30, 2001 || Palomar || NEAT ||  || align=right | 1.5 km || 
|-id=345 bgcolor=#d6d6d6
| 584345 ||  || — || May 18, 2007 || Bergisch Gladbach || W. Bickel || 7:4 || align=right | 5.5 km || 
|-id=346 bgcolor=#fefefe
| 584346 ||  || — || December 9, 2016 || Mount Lemmon || Mount Lemmon Survey || H || align=right data-sort-value="0.64" | 640 m || 
|-id=347 bgcolor=#fefefe
| 584347 ||  || — || September 15, 2013 || La Sagra || OAM Obs. || H || align=right data-sort-value="0.74" | 740 m || 
|-id=348 bgcolor=#d6d6d6
| 584348 ||  || — || December 7, 2015 || Haleakala || Pan-STARRS ||  || align=right | 2.8 km || 
|-id=349 bgcolor=#d6d6d6
| 584349 ||  || — || December 15, 2006 || Kitt Peak || Spacewatch ||  || align=right | 3.0 km || 
|-id=350 bgcolor=#d6d6d6
| 584350 ||  || — || November 5, 2016 || Mount Lemmon || Mount Lemmon Survey ||  || align=right | 3.5 km || 
|-id=351 bgcolor=#fefefe
| 584351 ||  || — || December 24, 2016 || Space Surveillance || Space Surveillance Telescope || H || align=right data-sort-value="0.75" | 750 m || 
|-id=352 bgcolor=#C2FFFF
| 584352 ||  || — || December 23, 2016 || Haleakala || Pan-STARRS || L5 || align=right | 8.3 km || 
|-id=353 bgcolor=#d6d6d6
| 584353 ||  || — || December 22, 2016 || Haleakala || Pan-STARRS ||  || align=right | 2.1 km || 
|-id=354 bgcolor=#E9E9E9
| 584354 ||  || — || February 7, 2013 || Nogales || M. Schwartz, P. R. Holvorcem ||  || align=right | 2.3 km || 
|-id=355 bgcolor=#d6d6d6
| 584355 ||  || — || February 23, 2012 || Mount Lemmon || Mount Lemmon Survey ||  || align=right | 2.2 km || 
|-id=356 bgcolor=#C2FFFF
| 584356 ||  || — || October 3, 2013 || Mount Lemmon || Mount Lemmon Survey || L5 || align=right | 9.7 km || 
|-id=357 bgcolor=#fefefe
| 584357 ||  || — || June 26, 2015 || Haleakala || Pan-STARRS || H || align=right data-sort-value="0.59" | 590 m || 
|-id=358 bgcolor=#fefefe
| 584358 ||  || — || August 13, 2015 || Space Surveillance || Space Surveillance Telescope || H || align=right data-sort-value="0.68" | 680 m || 
|-id=359 bgcolor=#FA8072
| 584359 ||  || — || June 27, 2015 || Haleakala || Pan-STARRS ||  || align=right | 1.1 km || 
|-id=360 bgcolor=#d6d6d6
| 584360 ||  || — || October 10, 2010 || Mount Lemmon || Mount Lemmon Survey ||  || align=right | 2.0 km || 
|-id=361 bgcolor=#fefefe
| 584361 ||  || — || September 7, 2002 || Campo Imperatore || CINEOS || H || align=right data-sort-value="0.47" | 470 m || 
|-id=362 bgcolor=#fefefe
| 584362 ||  || — || December 18, 2003 || Socorro || LINEAR || H || align=right data-sort-value="0.62" | 620 m || 
|-id=363 bgcolor=#C2FFFF
| 584363 ||  || — || July 28, 2011 || Haleakala || Pan-STARRS || L5 || align=right | 6.9 km || 
|-id=364 bgcolor=#C2FFFF
| 584364 ||  || — || October 15, 2012 || Mount Lemmon || Mount Lemmon Survey || L5 || align=right | 7.1 km || 
|-id=365 bgcolor=#fefefe
| 584365 ||  || — || February 10, 2007 || Mount Lemmon || Mount Lemmon Survey ||  || align=right data-sort-value="0.78" | 780 m || 
|-id=366 bgcolor=#fefefe
| 584366 ||  || — || December 1, 2006 || Mount Lemmon || Mount Lemmon Survey ||  || align=right data-sort-value="0.94" | 940 m || 
|-id=367 bgcolor=#fefefe
| 584367 ||  || — || October 30, 2007 || Mount Lemmon || Mount Lemmon Survey || H || align=right data-sort-value="0.64" | 640 m || 
|-id=368 bgcolor=#d6d6d6
| 584368 ||  || — || November 18, 2010 || Kitt Peak || Spacewatch ||  || align=right | 2.3 km || 
|-id=369 bgcolor=#fefefe
| 584369 ||  || — || January 23, 2006 || Kitt Peak || Spacewatch || H || align=right data-sort-value="0.61" | 610 m || 
|-id=370 bgcolor=#fefefe
| 584370 ||  || — || October 28, 2016 || Haleakala || Pan-STARRS || H || align=right data-sort-value="0.69" | 690 m || 
|-id=371 bgcolor=#d6d6d6
| 584371 ||  || — || February 5, 2006 || Kitt Peak || Spacewatch ||  || align=right | 3.4 km || 
|-id=372 bgcolor=#d6d6d6
| 584372 ||  || — || November 29, 2005 || Mount Lemmon || Mount Lemmon Survey ||  || align=right | 2.9 km || 
|-id=373 bgcolor=#fefefe
| 584373 ||  || — || September 28, 2003 || Kitt Peak || Spacewatch ||  || align=right data-sort-value="0.82" | 820 m || 
|-id=374 bgcolor=#fefefe
| 584374 ||  || — || October 9, 2008 || Kitt Peak || Spacewatch ||  || align=right | 1.1 km || 
|-id=375 bgcolor=#fefefe
| 584375 ||  || — || November 21, 2009 || Mount Lemmon || Mount Lemmon Survey ||  || align=right | 1.1 km || 
|-id=376 bgcolor=#fefefe
| 584376 ||  || — || January 22, 2006 || Mount Lemmon || Mount Lemmon Survey || H || align=right data-sort-value="0.56" | 560 m || 
|-id=377 bgcolor=#d6d6d6
| 584377 ||  || — || January 13, 2011 || Mount Lemmon || Mount Lemmon Survey ||  || align=right | 3.3 km || 
|-id=378 bgcolor=#d6d6d6
| 584378 ||  || — || January 9, 2006 || Kitt Peak || Spacewatch ||  || align=right | 3.0 km || 
|-id=379 bgcolor=#fefefe
| 584379 ||  || — || March 29, 2014 || Mount Lemmon || Mount Lemmon Survey ||  || align=right data-sort-value="0.65" | 650 m || 
|-id=380 bgcolor=#fefefe
| 584380 ||  || — || January 3, 2017 || Haleakala || Pan-STARRS ||  || align=right data-sort-value="0.67" | 670 m || 
|-id=381 bgcolor=#fefefe
| 584381 ||  || — || December 23, 2016 || Haleakala || Pan-STARRS ||  || align=right data-sort-value="0.72" | 720 m || 
|-id=382 bgcolor=#d6d6d6
| 584382 ||  || — || December 13, 2015 || Haleakala || Pan-STARRS || 7:4 || align=right | 3.1 km || 
|-id=383 bgcolor=#d6d6d6
| 584383 ||  || — || January 27, 2017 || Haleakala || Pan-STARRS || Tj (2.99) || align=right | 3.2 km || 
|-id=384 bgcolor=#fefefe
| 584384 ||  || — || January 27, 2017 || Haleakala || Pan-STARRS ||  || align=right data-sort-value="0.61" | 610 m || 
|-id=385 bgcolor=#C2FFFF
| 584385 ||  || — || November 20, 2014 || Haleakala || Pan-STARRS || L5 || align=right | 7.4 km || 
|-id=386 bgcolor=#fefefe
| 584386 ||  || — || November 20, 2009 || Mount Lemmon || Mount Lemmon Survey ||  || align=right data-sort-value="0.86" | 860 m || 
|-id=387 bgcolor=#fefefe
| 584387 ||  || — || December 16, 2006 || Kitt Peak || Spacewatch ||  || align=right data-sort-value="0.81" | 810 m || 
|-id=388 bgcolor=#fefefe
| 584388 ||  || — || March 27, 2003 || Socorro || LINEAR ||  || align=right data-sort-value="0.76" | 760 m || 
|-id=389 bgcolor=#C2FFFF
| 584389 ||  || — || March 9, 2007 || Kitt Peak || Spacewatch || L5 || align=right | 8.0 km || 
|-id=390 bgcolor=#fefefe
| 584390 ||  || — || September 25, 2012 || Kitt Peak || Spacewatch ||  || align=right data-sort-value="0.71" | 710 m || 
|-id=391 bgcolor=#fefefe
| 584391 ||  || — || April 29, 2014 || Haleakala || Pan-STARRS ||  || align=right data-sort-value="0.50" | 500 m || 
|-id=392 bgcolor=#fefefe
| 584392 ||  || — || July 29, 2008 || Mount Lemmon || Mount Lemmon Survey ||  || align=right data-sort-value="0.90" | 900 m || 
|-id=393 bgcolor=#fefefe
| 584393 ||  || — || September 18, 2015 || Mount Lemmon || Mount Lemmon Survey ||  || align=right data-sort-value="0.54" | 540 m || 
|-id=394 bgcolor=#C2FFFF
| 584394 ||  || — || January 29, 2017 || Haleakala || Pan-STARRS || L5 || align=right | 8.4 km || 
|-id=395 bgcolor=#C2FFFF
| 584395 ||  || — || January 27, 2017 || Haleakala || Pan-STARRS || L5 || align=right | 7.3 km || 
|-id=396 bgcolor=#E9E9E9
| 584396 ||  || — || January 28, 2017 || Haleakala || Pan-STARRS ||  || align=right | 1.8 km || 
|-id=397 bgcolor=#E9E9E9
| 584397 ||  || — || January 28, 2017 || Haleakala || Pan-STARRS ||  || align=right data-sort-value="0.86" | 860 m || 
|-id=398 bgcolor=#fefefe
| 584398 ||  || — || March 13, 2007 || Mount Lemmon || Mount Lemmon Survey || H || align=right data-sort-value="0.52" | 520 m || 
|-id=399 bgcolor=#fefefe
| 584399 ||  || — || August 14, 2004 || Cerro Tololo || Cerro Tololo Obs. ||  || align=right data-sort-value="0.60" | 600 m || 
|-id=400 bgcolor=#fefefe
| 584400 ||  || — || March 16, 2007 || Kitt Peak || Spacewatch ||  || align=right data-sort-value="0.58" | 580 m || 
|}

584401–584500 

|-bgcolor=#fefefe
| 584401 ||  || — || November 7, 2015 || Mount Lemmon || Mount Lemmon Survey ||  || align=right data-sort-value="0.65" | 650 m || 
|-id=402 bgcolor=#E9E9E9
| 584402 ||  || — || January 28, 2003 || Kitt Peak || Spacewatch ||  || align=right | 2.3 km || 
|-id=403 bgcolor=#fefefe
| 584403 ||  || — || October 9, 2012 || Mount Lemmon || Mount Lemmon Survey ||  || align=right data-sort-value="0.82" | 820 m || 
|-id=404 bgcolor=#d6d6d6
| 584404 ||  || — || July 19, 2015 || Haleakala || Pan-STARRS ||  || align=right | 3.2 km || 
|-id=405 bgcolor=#d6d6d6
| 584405 ||  || — || February 3, 2017 || Haleakala || Pan-STARRS ||  || align=right | 3.0 km || 
|-id=406 bgcolor=#fefefe
| 584406 ||  || — || August 24, 2008 || Kitt Peak || Spacewatch ||  || align=right data-sort-value="0.87" | 870 m || 
|-id=407 bgcolor=#d6d6d6
| 584407 ||  || — || January 23, 2006 || Kitt Peak || Spacewatch ||  || align=right | 2.5 km || 
|-id=408 bgcolor=#fefefe
| 584408 ||  || — || December 11, 2006 || Kitt Peak || Spacewatch ||  || align=right data-sort-value="0.79" | 790 m || 
|-id=409 bgcolor=#fefefe
| 584409 ||  || — || March 14, 2004 || Palomar || NEAT ||  || align=right data-sort-value="0.87" | 870 m || 
|-id=410 bgcolor=#fefefe
| 584410 ||  || — || April 30, 2011 || Mount Lemmon || Mount Lemmon Survey ||  || align=right data-sort-value="0.68" | 680 m || 
|-id=411 bgcolor=#fefefe
| 584411 ||  || — || October 9, 2012 || Mount Lemmon || Mount Lemmon Survey ||  || align=right data-sort-value="0.53" | 530 m || 
|-id=412 bgcolor=#d6d6d6
| 584412 ||  || — || February 3, 2000 || Kitt Peak || Spacewatch ||  || align=right | 2.4 km || 
|-id=413 bgcolor=#fefefe
| 584413 ||  || — || August 25, 2012 || Mount Lemmon || Mount Lemmon Survey ||  || align=right data-sort-value="0.53" | 530 m || 
|-id=414 bgcolor=#C2FFFF
| 584414 ||  || — || July 28, 2011 || Haleakala || Pan-STARRS || L5 || align=right | 6.7 km || 
|-id=415 bgcolor=#FA8072
| 584415 ||  || — || January 9, 2014 || Nogales || M. Schwartz, P. R. Holvorcem ||  || align=right data-sort-value="0.64" | 640 m || 
|-id=416 bgcolor=#fefefe
| 584416 ||  || — || February 21, 2007 || Kitt Peak || Spacewatch ||  || align=right data-sort-value="0.49" | 490 m || 
|-id=417 bgcolor=#fefefe
| 584417 ||  || — || September 6, 2008 || Mount Lemmon || Mount Lemmon Survey ||  || align=right data-sort-value="0.72" | 720 m || 
|-id=418 bgcolor=#fefefe
| 584418 ||  || — || March 28, 2014 || Mount Lemmon || Mount Lemmon Survey ||  || align=right data-sort-value="0.55" | 550 m || 
|-id=419 bgcolor=#fefefe
| 584419 ||  || — || April 30, 2011 || Mount Lemmon || Mount Lemmon Survey ||  || align=right data-sort-value="0.62" | 620 m || 
|-id=420 bgcolor=#fefefe
| 584420 ||  || — || September 26, 2011 || Haleakala || Pan-STARRS ||  || align=right data-sort-value="0.86" | 860 m || 
|-id=421 bgcolor=#fefefe
| 584421 ||  || — || September 14, 2012 || Kitt Peak || Spacewatch ||  || align=right data-sort-value="0.86" | 860 m || 
|-id=422 bgcolor=#d6d6d6
| 584422 ||  || — || February 27, 2006 || Mount Lemmon || Mount Lemmon Survey ||  || align=right | 2.4 km || 
|-id=423 bgcolor=#d6d6d6
| 584423 ||  || — || September 20, 2003 || Kitt Peak || Spacewatch ||  || align=right | 2.6 km || 
|-id=424 bgcolor=#fefefe
| 584424 ||  || — || October 1, 2005 || Kitt Peak || Spacewatch ||  || align=right data-sort-value="0.65" | 650 m || 
|-id=425 bgcolor=#fefefe
| 584425 ||  || — || October 8, 2012 || Kitt Peak || Spacewatch ||  || align=right data-sort-value="0.64" | 640 m || 
|-id=426 bgcolor=#d6d6d6
| 584426 ||  || — || February 10, 2011 || Mount Lemmon || Mount Lemmon Survey ||  || align=right | 2.8 km || 
|-id=427 bgcolor=#fefefe
| 584427 ||  || — || August 24, 2011 || Haleakala || Pan-STARRS ||  || align=right data-sort-value="0.64" | 640 m || 
|-id=428 bgcolor=#fefefe
| 584428 ||  || — || August 23, 2004 || Kitt Peak || Spacewatch ||  || align=right data-sort-value="0.87" | 870 m || 
|-id=429 bgcolor=#fefefe
| 584429 ||  || — || September 9, 2015 || Haleakala || Pan-STARRS ||  || align=right data-sort-value="0.61" | 610 m || 
|-id=430 bgcolor=#E9E9E9
| 584430 ||  || — || January 12, 2008 || Kitt Peak || Spacewatch ||  || align=right | 1.7 km || 
|-id=431 bgcolor=#fefefe
| 584431 ||  || — || November 10, 2009 || Mount Lemmon || Mount Lemmon Survey ||  || align=right data-sort-value="0.66" | 660 m || 
|-id=432 bgcolor=#fefefe
| 584432 ||  || — || March 26, 2003 || Palomar || NEAT ||  || align=right data-sort-value="0.79" | 790 m || 
|-id=433 bgcolor=#d6d6d6
| 584433 ||  || — || February 27, 2012 || Front Royal || D. R. Skillman ||  || align=right | 3.3 km || 
|-id=434 bgcolor=#fefefe
| 584434 ||  || — || March 11, 2007 || Kitt Peak || Spacewatch ||  || align=right data-sort-value="0.96" | 960 m || 
|-id=435 bgcolor=#fefefe
| 584435 ||  || — || December 13, 2006 || Mount Lemmon || Mount Lemmon Survey ||  || align=right data-sort-value="0.68" | 680 m || 
|-id=436 bgcolor=#fefefe
| 584436 ||  || — || October 29, 2005 || Mount Lemmon || Mount Lemmon Survey ||  || align=right data-sort-value="0.64" | 640 m || 
|-id=437 bgcolor=#E9E9E9
| 584437 ||  || — || August 22, 2014 || Haleakala || Pan-STARRS ||  || align=right | 2.2 km || 
|-id=438 bgcolor=#fefefe
| 584438 ||  || — || July 23, 2015 || Haleakala || Pan-STARRS ||  || align=right data-sort-value="0.60" | 600 m || 
|-id=439 bgcolor=#fefefe
| 584439 ||  || — || October 22, 2008 || Kitt Peak || Spacewatch ||  || align=right data-sort-value="0.77" | 770 m || 
|-id=440 bgcolor=#fefefe
| 584440 ||  || — || November 19, 2009 || Kitt Peak || Spacewatch ||  || align=right data-sort-value="0.67" | 670 m || 
|-id=441 bgcolor=#fefefe
| 584441 ||  || — || February 21, 2003 || Palomar || NEAT ||  || align=right data-sort-value="0.69" | 690 m || 
|-id=442 bgcolor=#fefefe
| 584442 ||  || — || March 23, 2004 || Socorro || LINEAR ||  || align=right data-sort-value="0.78" | 780 m || 
|-id=443 bgcolor=#fefefe
| 584443 ||  || — || February 16, 2010 || Kitt Peak || Spacewatch ||  || align=right data-sort-value="0.59" | 590 m || 
|-id=444 bgcolor=#fefefe
| 584444 ||  || — || November 6, 2012 || Mount Lemmon || Mount Lemmon Survey ||  || align=right data-sort-value="0.73" | 730 m || 
|-id=445 bgcolor=#d6d6d6
| 584445 ||  || — || August 16, 2009 || Kitt Peak || Spacewatch || EOS || align=right | 1.7 km || 
|-id=446 bgcolor=#E9E9E9
| 584446 ||  || — || November 13, 2006 || Mount Lemmon || Mount Lemmon Survey ||  || align=right | 2.3 km || 
|-id=447 bgcolor=#fefefe
| 584447 ||  || — || February 15, 2013 || Haleakala || Pan-STARRS ||  || align=right data-sort-value="0.94" | 940 m || 
|-id=448 bgcolor=#fefefe
| 584448 ||  || — || April 24, 2007 || Kitt Peak || Spacewatch ||  || align=right data-sort-value="0.59" | 590 m || 
|-id=449 bgcolor=#fefefe
| 584449 ||  || — || January 30, 2017 || Mount Lemmon || Mount Lemmon Survey ||  || align=right data-sort-value="0.92" | 920 m || 
|-id=450 bgcolor=#d6d6d6
| 584450 ||  || — || January 22, 2006 || Mount Lemmon || Mount Lemmon Survey ||  || align=right | 2.4 km || 
|-id=451 bgcolor=#fefefe
| 584451 ||  || — || January 30, 2006 || Kitt Peak || Spacewatch ||  || align=right data-sort-value="0.69" | 690 m || 
|-id=452 bgcolor=#fefefe
| 584452 ||  || — || April 19, 2007 || Mount Lemmon || Mount Lemmon Survey ||  || align=right data-sort-value="0.74" | 740 m || 
|-id=453 bgcolor=#fefefe
| 584453 ||  || — || August 25, 2003 || Palomar || NEAT ||  || align=right data-sort-value="0.98" | 980 m || 
|-id=454 bgcolor=#fefefe
| 584454 ||  || — || October 21, 2012 || Haleakala || Pan-STARRS ||  || align=right data-sort-value="0.74" | 740 m || 
|-id=455 bgcolor=#fefefe
| 584455 ||  || — || January 23, 2006 || Kitt Peak || Spacewatch ||  || align=right data-sort-value="0.75" | 750 m || 
|-id=456 bgcolor=#fefefe
| 584456 ||  || — || January 3, 2013 || Haleakala || Pan-STARRS ||  || align=right data-sort-value="0.84" | 840 m || 
|-id=457 bgcolor=#fefefe
| 584457 ||  || — || December 25, 2005 || Mount Lemmon || Mount Lemmon Survey ||  || align=right data-sort-value="0.74" | 740 m || 
|-id=458 bgcolor=#fefefe
| 584458 ||  || — || March 7, 2017 || Haleakala || Pan-STARRS ||  || align=right data-sort-value="0.62" | 620 m || 
|-id=459 bgcolor=#fefefe
| 584459 ||  || — || March 5, 2017 || Haleakala || Pan-STARRS ||  || align=right data-sort-value="0.57" | 570 m || 
|-id=460 bgcolor=#fefefe
| 584460 ||  || — || March 7, 2017 || Haleakala || Pan-STARRS ||  || align=right data-sort-value="0.65" | 650 m || 
|-id=461 bgcolor=#fefefe
| 584461 ||  || — || September 19, 2012 || Mount Lemmon || Mount Lemmon Survey ||  || align=right data-sort-value="0.55" | 550 m || 
|-id=462 bgcolor=#fefefe
| 584462 ||  || — || September 5, 2008 || Kitt Peak || Spacewatch ||  || align=right data-sort-value="0.90" | 900 m || 
|-id=463 bgcolor=#fefefe
| 584463 ||  || — || November 12, 2005 || Kitt Peak || Spacewatch ||  || align=right data-sort-value="0.83" | 830 m || 
|-id=464 bgcolor=#fefefe
| 584464 ||  || — || April 5, 2014 || Haleakala || Pan-STARRS ||  || align=right data-sort-value="0.54" | 540 m || 
|-id=465 bgcolor=#C2FFFF
| 584465 ||  || — || February 2, 2005 || Kitt Peak || Spacewatch || L5 || align=right | 11 km || 
|-id=466 bgcolor=#fefefe
| 584466 ||  || — || May 21, 2014 || Haleakala || Pan-STARRS ||  || align=right data-sort-value="0.67" | 670 m || 
|-id=467 bgcolor=#fefefe
| 584467 ||  || — || March 31, 2014 || Kitt Peak || Spacewatch ||  || align=right data-sort-value="0.72" | 720 m || 
|-id=468 bgcolor=#fefefe
| 584468 ||  || — || April 1, 2014 || Kitt Peak || Spacewatch ||  || align=right data-sort-value="0.54" | 540 m || 
|-id=469 bgcolor=#fefefe
| 584469 ||  || — || October 20, 2012 || Kitt Peak || Spacewatch ||  || align=right data-sort-value="0.48" | 480 m || 
|-id=470 bgcolor=#d6d6d6
| 584470 ||  || — || April 15, 2007 || Kitt Peak || Spacewatch ||  || align=right | 2.1 km || 
|-id=471 bgcolor=#fefefe
| 584471 ||  || — || March 21, 2004 || Kitt Peak || Spacewatch ||  || align=right data-sort-value="0.48" | 480 m || 
|-id=472 bgcolor=#fefefe
| 584472 ||  || — || April 9, 2010 || Kitt Peak || Spacewatch ||  || align=right data-sort-value="0.80" | 800 m || 
|-id=473 bgcolor=#fefefe
| 584473 ||  || — || October 27, 2005 || Kitt Peak || Spacewatch ||  || align=right data-sort-value="0.62" | 620 m || 
|-id=474 bgcolor=#fefefe
| 584474 ||  || — || March 14, 2007 || Kitt Peak || Spacewatch ||  || align=right data-sort-value="0.55" | 550 m || 
|-id=475 bgcolor=#fefefe
| 584475 ||  || — || March 11, 2007 || Kitt Peak || Spacewatch ||  || align=right data-sort-value="0.58" | 580 m || 
|-id=476 bgcolor=#fefefe
| 584476 ||  || — || June 15, 2001 || Palomar || NEAT ||  || align=right data-sort-value="0.83" | 830 m || 
|-id=477 bgcolor=#fefefe
| 584477 ||  || — || March 12, 2010 || Mount Lemmon || Mount Lemmon Survey ||  || align=right data-sort-value="0.71" | 710 m || 
|-id=478 bgcolor=#fefefe
| 584478 ||  || — || April 18, 2007 || Mount Lemmon || Mount Lemmon Survey ||  || align=right data-sort-value="0.52" | 520 m || 
|-id=479 bgcolor=#fefefe
| 584479 ||  || — || January 26, 2007 || Kitt Peak || Spacewatch ||  || align=right data-sort-value="0.49" | 490 m || 
|-id=480 bgcolor=#fefefe
| 584480 ||  || — || April 30, 2014 || Haleakala || Pan-STARRS ||  || align=right data-sort-value="0.67" | 670 m || 
|-id=481 bgcolor=#fefefe
| 584481 ||  || — || August 24, 2007 || Kitt Peak || Spacewatch ||  || align=right data-sort-value="0.75" | 750 m || 
|-id=482 bgcolor=#fefefe
| 584482 ||  || — || January 27, 2006 || Mount Lemmon || Mount Lemmon Survey ||  || align=right data-sort-value="0.67" | 670 m || 
|-id=483 bgcolor=#fefefe
| 584483 ||  || — || January 27, 2007 || Mount Lemmon || Mount Lemmon Survey ||  || align=right data-sort-value="0.66" | 660 m || 
|-id=484 bgcolor=#fefefe
| 584484 ||  || — || October 23, 2005 || Catalina || CSS ||  || align=right data-sort-value="0.73" | 730 m || 
|-id=485 bgcolor=#fefefe
| 584485 ||  || — || April 11, 2007 || Kitt Peak || Spacewatch ||  || align=right data-sort-value="0.71" | 710 m || 
|-id=486 bgcolor=#fefefe
| 584486 ||  || — || March 18, 2010 || Mount Lemmon || Mount Lemmon Survey ||  || align=right data-sort-value="0.64" | 640 m || 
|-id=487 bgcolor=#fefefe
| 584487 ||  || — || July 30, 2005 || Palomar || NEAT ||  || align=right data-sort-value="0.69" | 690 m || 
|-id=488 bgcolor=#fefefe
| 584488 ||  || — || January 9, 2006 || Mount Lemmon || Mount Lemmon Survey ||  || align=right data-sort-value="0.62" | 620 m || 
|-id=489 bgcolor=#fefefe
| 584489 ||  || — || April 11, 2003 || Kitt Peak || Spacewatch ||  || align=right data-sort-value="0.92" | 920 m || 
|-id=490 bgcolor=#fefefe
| 584490 ||  || — || February 1, 2003 || Kitt Peak || Spacewatch ||  || align=right data-sort-value="0.73" | 730 m || 
|-id=491 bgcolor=#fefefe
| 584491 ||  || — || October 9, 2015 || Haleakala || Pan-STARRS ||  || align=right data-sort-value="0.77" | 770 m || 
|-id=492 bgcolor=#fefefe
| 584492 ||  || — || October 1, 2005 || Mount Lemmon || Mount Lemmon Survey ||  || align=right data-sort-value="0.61" | 610 m || 
|-id=493 bgcolor=#fefefe
| 584493 ||  || — || December 24, 2005 || Kitt Peak || Spacewatch ||  || align=right data-sort-value="0.79" | 790 m || 
|-id=494 bgcolor=#fefefe
| 584494 ||  || — || April 24, 2003 || Kitt Peak || Spacewatch ||  || align=right data-sort-value="0.66" | 660 m || 
|-id=495 bgcolor=#fefefe
| 584495 ||  || — || January 6, 2006 || Mount Lemmon || Mount Lemmon Survey || H || align=right data-sort-value="0.70" | 700 m || 
|-id=496 bgcolor=#fefefe
| 584496 ||  || — || June 21, 2014 || Haleakala || Pan-STARRS ||  || align=right data-sort-value="0.60" | 600 m || 
|-id=497 bgcolor=#fefefe
| 584497 ||  || — || November 4, 2005 || Mount Lemmon || Mount Lemmon Survey ||  || align=right data-sort-value="0.72" | 720 m || 
|-id=498 bgcolor=#fefefe
| 584498 ||  || — || September 29, 2008 || Kitt Peak || Spacewatch ||  || align=right data-sort-value="0.64" | 640 m || 
|-id=499 bgcolor=#fefefe
| 584499 ||  || — || February 3, 2013 || Haleakala || Pan-STARRS ||  || align=right data-sort-value="0.88" | 880 m || 
|-id=500 bgcolor=#E9E9E9
| 584500 ||  || — || August 23, 2014 || Haleakala || Pan-STARRS ||  || align=right | 2.0 km || 
|}

584501–584600 

|-bgcolor=#fefefe
| 584501 ||  || — || March 25, 2003 || Palomar || NEAT ||  || align=right data-sort-value="0.82" | 820 m || 
|-id=502 bgcolor=#fefefe
| 584502 ||  || — || March 23, 2003 || Kitt Peak || Spacewatch ||  || align=right data-sort-value="0.79" | 790 m || 
|-id=503 bgcolor=#fefefe
| 584503 ||  || — || July 22, 2011 || Haleakala || Pan-STARRS ||  || align=right data-sort-value="0.77" | 770 m || 
|-id=504 bgcolor=#fefefe
| 584504 ||  || — || October 28, 2005 || Catalina || CSS ||  || align=right data-sort-value="0.68" | 680 m || 
|-id=505 bgcolor=#C2FFFF
| 584505 ||  || — || January 18, 2004 || Kitt Peak || Spacewatch || L5 || align=right | 12 km || 
|-id=506 bgcolor=#fefefe
| 584506 ||  || — || January 2, 2017 || Haleakala || Pan-STARRS ||  || align=right data-sort-value="0.57" | 570 m || 
|-id=507 bgcolor=#fefefe
| 584507 ||  || — || January 8, 2010 || Mount Lemmon || Mount Lemmon Survey ||  || align=right data-sort-value="0.71" | 710 m || 
|-id=508 bgcolor=#fefefe
| 584508 ||  || — || February 15, 2010 || Kitt Peak || Spacewatch ||  || align=right data-sort-value="0.57" | 570 m || 
|-id=509 bgcolor=#fefefe
| 584509 ||  || — || May 8, 2014 || Haleakala || Pan-STARRS ||  || align=right data-sort-value="0.55" | 550 m || 
|-id=510 bgcolor=#fefefe
| 584510 ||  || — || January 27, 2007 || Kitt Peak || Spacewatch ||  || align=right data-sort-value="0.55" | 550 m || 
|-id=511 bgcolor=#fefefe
| 584511 ||  || — || July 25, 2011 || Haleakala || Pan-STARRS ||  || align=right data-sort-value="0.63" | 630 m || 
|-id=512 bgcolor=#fefefe
| 584512 ||  || — || August 20, 2004 || Kitt Peak || Spacewatch ||  || align=right data-sort-value="0.67" | 670 m || 
|-id=513 bgcolor=#fefefe
| 584513 ||  || — || May 6, 2014 || Mount Lemmon || Mount Lemmon Survey ||  || align=right data-sort-value="0.43" | 430 m || 
|-id=514 bgcolor=#d6d6d6
| 584514 ||  || — || September 10, 2009 || Catalina || CSS ||  || align=right | 3.1 km || 
|-id=515 bgcolor=#fefefe
| 584515 ||  || — || February 21, 2017 || Haleakala || Pan-STARRS ||  || align=right data-sort-value="0.61" | 610 m || 
|-id=516 bgcolor=#fefefe
| 584516 ||  || — || November 3, 2008 || Kitt Peak || Spacewatch ||  || align=right data-sort-value="0.78" | 780 m || 
|-id=517 bgcolor=#fefefe
| 584517 ||  || — || September 12, 2015 || Haleakala || Pan-STARRS ||  || align=right data-sort-value="0.71" | 710 m || 
|-id=518 bgcolor=#fefefe
| 584518 ||  || — || November 3, 2015 || Mount Lemmon || Mount Lemmon Survey ||  || align=right data-sort-value="0.66" | 660 m || 
|-id=519 bgcolor=#fefefe
| 584519 ||  || — || April 1, 2003 || Kitt Peak || M. W. Buie, A. B. Jordan ||  || align=right data-sort-value="0.78" | 780 m || 
|-id=520 bgcolor=#fefefe
| 584520 ||  || — || January 9, 2007 || Mount Lemmon || Mount Lemmon Survey ||  || align=right data-sort-value="0.46" | 460 m || 
|-id=521 bgcolor=#fefefe
| 584521 ||  || — || October 18, 2015 || Haleakala || Pan-STARRS ||  || align=right data-sort-value="0.51" | 510 m || 
|-id=522 bgcolor=#fefefe
| 584522 ||  || — || April 10, 2003 || Kitt Peak || Spacewatch ||  || align=right data-sort-value="0.67" | 670 m || 
|-id=523 bgcolor=#fefefe
| 584523 ||  || — || April 4, 2014 || Haleakala || Pan-STARRS ||  || align=right data-sort-value="0.67" | 670 m || 
|-id=524 bgcolor=#fefefe
| 584524 ||  || — || September 23, 2015 || Haleakala || Pan-STARRS ||  || align=right data-sort-value="0.68" | 680 m || 
|-id=525 bgcolor=#fefefe
| 584525 ||  || — || November 19, 2008 || Mount Lemmon || Mount Lemmon Survey ||  || align=right data-sort-value="0.80" | 800 m || 
|-id=526 bgcolor=#fefefe
| 584526 ||  || — || July 25, 2015 || Haleakala || Pan-STARRS ||  || align=right data-sort-value="0.55" | 550 m || 
|-id=527 bgcolor=#fefefe
| 584527 ||  || — || March 18, 2017 || Mount Lemmon || Mount Lemmon Survey ||  || align=right data-sort-value="0.63" | 630 m || 
|-id=528 bgcolor=#fefefe
| 584528 ||  || — || September 26, 2011 || Haleakala || Pan-STARRS ||  || align=right data-sort-value="0.57" | 570 m || 
|-id=529 bgcolor=#fefefe
| 584529 ||  || — || March 6, 2013 || Haleakala || Pan-STARRS ||  || align=right data-sort-value="0.75" | 750 m || 
|-id=530 bgcolor=#B88A00
| 584530 ||  || — || July 17, 2007 || Dauban || C. Rinner, F. Kugel || Tj (2.73) || align=right | 5.8 km || 
|-id=531 bgcolor=#fefefe
| 584531 ||  || — || May 15, 2012 || Haleakala || Pan-STARRS || H || align=right data-sort-value="0.75" | 750 m || 
|-id=532 bgcolor=#d6d6d6
| 584532 ||  || — || March 23, 2001 || Haleakala || AMOS ||  || align=right | 4.0 km || 
|-id=533 bgcolor=#fefefe
| 584533 ||  || — || April 27, 2012 || Haleakala || Pan-STARRS || H || align=right data-sort-value="0.54" | 540 m || 
|-id=534 bgcolor=#fefefe
| 584534 ||  || — || November 28, 2006 || Mount Lemmon || Mount Lemmon Survey ||  || align=right data-sort-value="0.55" | 550 m || 
|-id=535 bgcolor=#fefefe
| 584535 ||  || — || February 25, 2012 || Mount Lemmon || Mount Lemmon Survey || H || align=right data-sort-value="0.52" | 520 m || 
|-id=536 bgcolor=#fefefe
| 584536 ||  || — || January 22, 2013 || Mount Lemmon || Mount Lemmon Survey ||  || align=right data-sort-value="0.65" | 650 m || 
|-id=537 bgcolor=#fefefe
| 584537 ||  || — || January 7, 2006 || Kitt Peak || Spacewatch ||  || align=right data-sort-value="0.73" | 730 m || 
|-id=538 bgcolor=#fefefe
| 584538 ||  || — || November 21, 2015 || Mount Lemmon || Mount Lemmon Survey ||  || align=right data-sort-value="0.57" | 570 m || 
|-id=539 bgcolor=#fefefe
| 584539 ||  || — || October 5, 2003 || Kitt Peak || Spacewatch ||  || align=right data-sort-value="0.73" | 730 m || 
|-id=540 bgcolor=#fefefe
| 584540 ||  || — || October 8, 2007 || Mount Lemmon || Mount Lemmon Survey ||  || align=right data-sort-value="0.66" | 660 m || 
|-id=541 bgcolor=#d6d6d6
| 584541 ||  || — || September 22, 2008 || Kitt Peak || Spacewatch ||  || align=right | 3.2 km || 
|-id=542 bgcolor=#fefefe
| 584542 ||  || — || March 25, 2010 || Kitt Peak || Spacewatch ||  || align=right data-sort-value="0.63" | 630 m || 
|-id=543 bgcolor=#fefefe
| 584543 ||  || — || March 18, 2010 || Mount Lemmon || Mount Lemmon Survey ||  || align=right data-sort-value="0.50" | 500 m || 
|-id=544 bgcolor=#fefefe
| 584544 ||  || — || September 17, 1995 || Kitt Peak || Spacewatch ||  || align=right data-sort-value="0.68" | 680 m || 
|-id=545 bgcolor=#fefefe
| 584545 ||  || — || February 17, 2013 || Mount Lemmon || Mount Lemmon Survey ||  || align=right data-sort-value="0.69" | 690 m || 
|-id=546 bgcolor=#fefefe
| 584546 ||  || — || March 19, 2013 || Haleakala || Pan-STARRS ||  || align=right data-sort-value="0.71" | 710 m || 
|-id=547 bgcolor=#fefefe
| 584547 ||  || — || October 29, 2005 || Mount Lemmon || Mount Lemmon Survey ||  || align=right data-sort-value="0.73" | 730 m || 
|-id=548 bgcolor=#E9E9E9
| 584548 ||  || — || February 1, 2016 || Haleakala || Pan-STARRS ||  || align=right | 1.9 km || 
|-id=549 bgcolor=#fefefe
| 584549 ||  || — || May 2, 2003 || Kitt Peak || Spacewatch ||  || align=right data-sort-value="0.98" | 980 m || 
|-id=550 bgcolor=#fefefe
| 584550 ||  || — || August 24, 2007 || Kitt Peak || Spacewatch ||  || align=right data-sort-value="0.63" | 630 m || 
|-id=551 bgcolor=#fefefe
| 584551 ||  || — || November 29, 2003 || Kitt Peak || Spacewatch ||  || align=right data-sort-value="0.80" | 800 m || 
|-id=552 bgcolor=#fefefe
| 584552 ||  || — || July 31, 2014 || Haleakala || Pan-STARRS ||  || align=right data-sort-value="0.71" | 710 m || 
|-id=553 bgcolor=#fefefe
| 584553 ||  || — || February 21, 2003 || Palomar || NEAT ||  || align=right data-sort-value="0.63" | 630 m || 
|-id=554 bgcolor=#fefefe
| 584554 ||  || — || May 6, 2006 || Kitt Peak || Spacewatch ||  || align=right data-sort-value="0.64" | 640 m || 
|-id=555 bgcolor=#fefefe
| 584555 ||  || — || January 16, 2013 || Mount Lemmon || Mount Lemmon Survey ||  || align=right data-sort-value="0.47" | 470 m || 
|-id=556 bgcolor=#fefefe
| 584556 ||  || — || July 25, 2014 || Haleakala || Pan-STARRS ||  || align=right data-sort-value="0.79" | 790 m || 
|-id=557 bgcolor=#fefefe
| 584557 ||  || — || October 15, 2001 || Palomar || NEAT ||  || align=right data-sort-value="0.81" | 810 m || 
|-id=558 bgcolor=#fefefe
| 584558 ||  || — || October 10, 2015 || Haleakala || Pan-STARRS ||  || align=right data-sort-value="0.58" | 580 m || 
|-id=559 bgcolor=#fefefe
| 584559 ||  || — || April 26, 2017 || Haleakala || Pan-STARRS ||  || align=right data-sort-value="0.67" | 670 m || 
|-id=560 bgcolor=#fefefe
| 584560 ||  || — || April 26, 2017 || Haleakala || Pan-STARRS ||  || align=right data-sort-value="0.81" | 810 m || 
|-id=561 bgcolor=#fefefe
| 584561 ||  || — || September 1, 2014 || Mount Lemmon || Mount Lemmon Survey ||  || align=right data-sort-value="0.53" | 530 m || 
|-id=562 bgcolor=#E9E9E9
| 584562 ||  || — || April 26, 2017 || Haleakala || Pan-STARRS ||  || align=right data-sort-value="0.69" | 690 m || 
|-id=563 bgcolor=#fefefe
| 584563 ||  || — || September 20, 2011 || Kitt Peak || Spacewatch ||  || align=right | 1.1 km || 
|-id=564 bgcolor=#fefefe
| 584564 ||  || — || October 6, 2008 || Kitt Peak || Spacewatch ||  || align=right data-sort-value="0.71" | 710 m || 
|-id=565 bgcolor=#fefefe
| 584565 ||  || — || May 26, 2000 || Kitt Peak || Spacewatch ||  || align=right data-sort-value="0.56" | 560 m || 
|-id=566 bgcolor=#fefefe
| 584566 ||  || — || September 5, 2015 || Haleakala || Pan-STARRS || H || align=right data-sort-value="0.59" | 590 m || 
|-id=567 bgcolor=#fefefe
| 584567 ||  || — || February 13, 2009 || Mount Lemmon || Mount Lemmon Survey ||  || align=right data-sort-value="0.84" | 840 m || 
|-id=568 bgcolor=#fefefe
| 584568 ||  || — || March 8, 2013 || Haleakala || Pan-STARRS ||  || align=right data-sort-value="0.91" | 910 m || 
|-id=569 bgcolor=#fefefe
| 584569 ||  || — || March 16, 2007 || Kitt Peak || Spacewatch ||  || align=right data-sort-value="0.64" | 640 m || 
|-id=570 bgcolor=#fefefe
| 584570 ||  || — || February 16, 2013 || Mount Lemmon || Mount Lemmon Survey ||  || align=right data-sort-value="0.81" | 810 m || 
|-id=571 bgcolor=#fefefe
| 584571 ||  || — || November 9, 2007 || Mount Lemmon || Mount Lemmon Survey ||  || align=right | 1.1 km || 
|-id=572 bgcolor=#fefefe
| 584572 ||  || — || January 5, 2013 || Kitt Peak || Spacewatch ||  || align=right data-sort-value="0.63" | 630 m || 
|-id=573 bgcolor=#fefefe
| 584573 ||  || — || January 5, 2013 || Kitt Peak || Spacewatch ||  || align=right data-sort-value="0.52" | 520 m || 
|-id=574 bgcolor=#fefefe
| 584574 ||  || — || October 2, 2008 || Kitt Peak || Spacewatch ||  || align=right data-sort-value="0.73" | 730 m || 
|-id=575 bgcolor=#fefefe
| 584575 ||  || — || February 14, 2010 || Mount Lemmon || Mount Lemmon Survey ||  || align=right data-sort-value="0.71" | 710 m || 
|-id=576 bgcolor=#fefefe
| 584576 ||  || — || January 18, 2009 || Mount Lemmon || Mount Lemmon Survey ||  || align=right data-sort-value="0.76" | 760 m || 
|-id=577 bgcolor=#E9E9E9
| 584577 ||  || — || November 16, 2014 || Mount Lemmon || Mount Lemmon Survey ||  || align=right data-sort-value="0.75" | 750 m || 
|-id=578 bgcolor=#fefefe
| 584578 ||  || — || January 30, 2006 || Kitt Peak || Spacewatch ||  || align=right data-sort-value="0.55" | 550 m || 
|-id=579 bgcolor=#d6d6d6
| 584579 ||  || — || March 4, 2011 || Kitt Peak || Spacewatch ||  || align=right | 2.8 km || 
|-id=580 bgcolor=#fefefe
| 584580 ||  || — || May 11, 2010 || Mount Lemmon || Mount Lemmon Survey ||  || align=right data-sort-value="0.79" | 790 m || 
|-id=581 bgcolor=#fefefe
| 584581 ||  || — || November 18, 2008 || Kitt Peak || Spacewatch ||  || align=right data-sort-value="0.80" | 800 m || 
|-id=582 bgcolor=#fefefe
| 584582 ||  || — || October 24, 2015 || Haleakala || Pan-STARRS || H || align=right data-sort-value="0.75" | 750 m || 
|-id=583 bgcolor=#fefefe
| 584583 ||  || — || November 18, 2015 || Haleakala || Pan-STARRS || H || align=right data-sort-value="0.75" | 750 m || 
|-id=584 bgcolor=#fefefe
| 584584 ||  || — || April 4, 2017 || Haleakala || Pan-STARRS ||  || align=right data-sort-value="0.83" | 830 m || 
|-id=585 bgcolor=#fefefe
| 584585 ||  || — || December 30, 2008 || Kitt Peak || Spacewatch ||  || align=right data-sort-value="0.98" | 980 m || 
|-id=586 bgcolor=#E9E9E9
| 584586 ||  || — || June 20, 2013 || Mount Lemmon || Mount Lemmon Survey ||  || align=right | 1.7 km || 
|-id=587 bgcolor=#fefefe
| 584587 ||  || — || December 1, 2008 || Kitt Peak || Spacewatch ||  || align=right data-sort-value="0.64" | 640 m || 
|-id=588 bgcolor=#E9E9E9
| 584588 ||  || — || June 10, 2013 || Mount Lemmon || Mount Lemmon Survey ||  || align=right | 1.1 km || 
|-id=589 bgcolor=#E9E9E9
| 584589 ||  || — || June 25, 2017 || Haleakala || Pan-STARRS ||  || align=right data-sort-value="0.98" | 980 m || 
|-id=590 bgcolor=#d6d6d6
| 584590 ||  || — || June 25, 2017 || Haleakala || Pan-STARRS ||  || align=right | 2.0 km || 
|-id=591 bgcolor=#E9E9E9
| 584591 ||  || — || September 7, 2004 || Socorro || LINEAR ||  || align=right | 1.5 km || 
|-id=592 bgcolor=#E9E9E9
| 584592 ||  || — || February 21, 2003 || Palomar || NEAT ||  || align=right | 1.1 km || 
|-id=593 bgcolor=#fefefe
| 584593 ||  || — || February 10, 2016 || Haleakala || Pan-STARRS ||  || align=right data-sort-value="0.75" | 750 m || 
|-id=594 bgcolor=#d6d6d6
| 584594 ||  || — || January 18, 1999 || Kitt Peak || Spacewatch ||  || align=right | 3.0 km || 
|-id=595 bgcolor=#fefefe
| 584595 ||  || — || July 13, 2013 || Mount Lemmon || Mount Lemmon Survey ||  || align=right data-sort-value="0.80" | 800 m || 
|-id=596 bgcolor=#E9E9E9
| 584596 ||  || — || July 30, 2009 || Kitt Peak || Spacewatch ||  || align=right data-sort-value="0.83" | 830 m || 
|-id=597 bgcolor=#E9E9E9
| 584597 ||  || — || February 8, 2007 || Palomar || NEAT ||  || align=right | 1.5 km || 
|-id=598 bgcolor=#E9E9E9
| 584598 ||  || — || February 14, 2010 || Mount Lemmon || Mount Lemmon Survey ||  || align=right | 1.4 km || 
|-id=599 bgcolor=#d6d6d6
| 584599 ||  || — || January 18, 2015 || Haleakala || Pan-STARRS ||  || align=right | 2.6 km || 
|-id=600 bgcolor=#E9E9E9
| 584600 ||  || — || June 20, 2013 || Haleakala || Pan-STARRS ||  || align=right data-sort-value="0.75" | 750 m || 
|}

584601–584700 

|-bgcolor=#d6d6d6
| 584601 ||  || — || September 15, 2010 || Kitt Peak || Spacewatch || 3:2 || align=right | 4.0 km || 
|-id=602 bgcolor=#E9E9E9
| 584602 ||  || — || March 11, 2003 || Palomar || NEAT ||  || align=right | 1.5 km || 
|-id=603 bgcolor=#E9E9E9
| 584603 ||  || — || April 5, 2016 || Haleakala || Pan-STARRS ||  || align=right | 1.6 km || 
|-id=604 bgcolor=#FFC2E0
| 584604 ||  || — || July 27, 2017 || Haleakala || Pan-STARRS || AMO || align=right data-sort-value="0.10" | 100 m || 
|-id=605 bgcolor=#E9E9E9
| 584605 ||  || — || July 14, 2013 || Haleakala || Pan-STARRS ||  || align=right data-sort-value="0.76" | 760 m || 
|-id=606 bgcolor=#E9E9E9
| 584606 ||  || — || December 26, 2014 || Haleakala || Pan-STARRS ||  || align=right | 1.7 km || 
|-id=607 bgcolor=#E9E9E9
| 584607 ||  || — || January 16, 2015 || Haleakala || Pan-STARRS ||  || align=right | 1.7 km || 
|-id=608 bgcolor=#E9E9E9
| 584608 ||  || — || April 24, 2004 || Kitt Peak || Spacewatch ||  || align=right | 1.1 km || 
|-id=609 bgcolor=#E9E9E9
| 584609 ||  || — || May 15, 2012 || Haleakala || Pan-STARRS ||  || align=right | 1.1 km || 
|-id=610 bgcolor=#E9E9E9
| 584610 ||  || — || April 11, 2016 || Haleakala || Pan-STARRS ||  || align=right | 1.4 km || 
|-id=611 bgcolor=#d6d6d6
| 584611 ||  || — || January 22, 2015 || Haleakala || Pan-STARRS ||  || align=right | 2.3 km || 
|-id=612 bgcolor=#d6d6d6
| 584612 ||  || — || November 1, 2013 || Kitt Peak || Spacewatch ||  || align=right | 2.3 km || 
|-id=613 bgcolor=#E9E9E9
| 584613 ||  || — || January 26, 2015 || Haleakala || Pan-STARRS ||  || align=right | 1.5 km || 
|-id=614 bgcolor=#E9E9E9
| 584614 ||  || — || October 11, 2001 || Kitt Peak || Spacewatch ||  || align=right data-sort-value="0.82" | 820 m || 
|-id=615 bgcolor=#E9E9E9
| 584615 ||  || — || April 15, 2004 || Siding Spring || SSS ||  || align=right data-sort-value="0.93" | 930 m || 
|-id=616 bgcolor=#E9E9E9
| 584616 ||  || — || August 26, 2013 || Haleakala || Pan-STARRS ||  || align=right | 1.3 km || 
|-id=617 bgcolor=#E9E9E9
| 584617 ||  || — || February 10, 2011 || Mount Lemmon || Mount Lemmon Survey ||  || align=right data-sort-value="0.77" | 770 m || 
|-id=618 bgcolor=#E9E9E9
| 584618 ||  || — || September 11, 2004 || Kitt Peak || Spacewatch ||  || align=right | 1.5 km || 
|-id=619 bgcolor=#E9E9E9
| 584619 ||  || — || April 4, 2016 || Haleakala || Pan-STARRS ||  || align=right data-sort-value="0.82" | 820 m || 
|-id=620 bgcolor=#E9E9E9
| 584620 ||  || — || September 15, 2013 || Haleakala || Pan-STARRS ||  || align=right data-sort-value="0.97" | 970 m || 
|-id=621 bgcolor=#E9E9E9
| 584621 ||  || — || September 9, 2004 || Kitt Peak || Spacewatch ||  || align=right | 1.2 km || 
|-id=622 bgcolor=#E9E9E9
| 584622 ||  || — || January 18, 2015 || Mount Lemmon || Mount Lemmon Survey ||  || align=right | 1.2 km || 
|-id=623 bgcolor=#d6d6d6
| 584623 ||  || — || July 27, 2017 || Haleakala || Pan-STARRS ||  || align=right | 2.8 km || 
|-id=624 bgcolor=#d6d6d6
| 584624 ||  || — || February 20, 2015 || Haleakala || Pan-STARRS ||  || align=right | 2.5 km || 
|-id=625 bgcolor=#E9E9E9
| 584625 ||  || — || February 8, 2015 || Mount Lemmon || Mount Lemmon Survey ||  || align=right | 2.2 km || 
|-id=626 bgcolor=#E9E9E9
| 584626 ||  || — || April 26, 2008 || Kitt Peak || Spacewatch ||  || align=right | 1.3 km || 
|-id=627 bgcolor=#E9E9E9
| 584627 ||  || — || October 27, 2005 || Mount Lemmon || Mount Lemmon Survey ||  || align=right data-sort-value="0.60" | 600 m || 
|-id=628 bgcolor=#E9E9E9
| 584628 ||  || — || December 29, 2014 || Haleakala || Pan-STARRS ||  || align=right data-sort-value="0.95" | 950 m || 
|-id=629 bgcolor=#fefefe
| 584629 ||  || — || September 14, 2010 || Mount Lemmon || Mount Lemmon Survey ||  || align=right data-sort-value="0.63" | 630 m || 
|-id=630 bgcolor=#E9E9E9
| 584630 ||  || — || January 27, 2011 || Mount Lemmon || Mount Lemmon Survey ||  || align=right | 1.5 km || 
|-id=631 bgcolor=#fefefe
| 584631 ||  || — || June 25, 2017 || Haleakala || Pan-STARRS ||  || align=right data-sort-value="0.91" | 910 m || 
|-id=632 bgcolor=#d6d6d6
| 584632 ||  || — || December 6, 2013 || Haleakala || Pan-STARRS ||  || align=right | 2.3 km || 
|-id=633 bgcolor=#E9E9E9
| 584633 ||  || — || February 13, 2007 || Mount Lemmon || Mount Lemmon Survey ||  || align=right | 1.3 km || 
|-id=634 bgcolor=#E9E9E9
| 584634 ||  || — || July 14, 2013 || Haleakala || Pan-STARRS ||  || align=right data-sort-value="0.89" | 890 m || 
|-id=635 bgcolor=#d6d6d6
| 584635 ||  || — || December 21, 2014 || Haleakala || Pan-STARRS ||  || align=right | 1.6 km || 
|-id=636 bgcolor=#E9E9E9
| 584636 ||  || — || February 24, 2012 || Mount Lemmon || Mount Lemmon Survey ||  || align=right data-sort-value="0.71" | 710 m || 
|-id=637 bgcolor=#d6d6d6
| 584637 ||  || — || October 9, 2012 || Haleakala || Pan-STARRS ||  || align=right | 2.4 km || 
|-id=638 bgcolor=#d6d6d6
| 584638 ||  || — || July 30, 2017 || Haleakala || Pan-STARRS ||  || align=right | 2.5 km || 
|-id=639 bgcolor=#E9E9E9
| 584639 ||  || — || February 21, 2007 || Mount Lemmon || Mount Lemmon Survey ||  || align=right | 1.1 km || 
|-id=640 bgcolor=#d6d6d6
| 584640 ||  || — || December 31, 2013 || Mount Lemmon || Mount Lemmon Survey ||  || align=right | 2.6 km || 
|-id=641 bgcolor=#E9E9E9
| 584641 ||  || — || September 10, 2013 || Haleakala || Pan-STARRS ||  || align=right | 1.2 km || 
|-id=642 bgcolor=#E9E9E9
| 584642 ||  || — || January 17, 2015 || Haleakala || Pan-STARRS ||  || align=right data-sort-value="0.75" | 750 m || 
|-id=643 bgcolor=#E9E9E9
| 584643 ||  || — || July 17, 2004 || Cerro Tololo || Cerro Tololo Obs. ||  || align=right | 1.6 km || 
|-id=644 bgcolor=#E9E9E9
| 584644 ||  || — || September 22, 2008 || Mount Lemmon || Mount Lemmon Survey ||  || align=right | 2.3 km || 
|-id=645 bgcolor=#E9E9E9
| 584645 ||  || — || September 28, 2013 || Catalina || CSS ||  || align=right | 1.2 km || 
|-id=646 bgcolor=#E9E9E9
| 584646 ||  || — || March 1, 2011 || Mount Lemmon || Mount Lemmon Survey ||  || align=right | 1.7 km || 
|-id=647 bgcolor=#E9E9E9
| 584647 ||  || — || July 26, 2017 || Haleakala || Pan-STARRS ||  || align=right | 1.7 km || 
|-id=648 bgcolor=#d6d6d6
| 584648 ||  || — || July 26, 2017 || Haleakala || Pan-STARRS ||  || align=right | 3.2 km || 
|-id=649 bgcolor=#d6d6d6
| 584649 ||  || — || July 25, 2017 || Haleakala || Pan-STARRS ||  || align=right | 1.8 km || 
|-id=650 bgcolor=#E9E9E9
| 584650 ||  || — || March 1, 2011 || Mount Lemmon || Mount Lemmon Survey ||  || align=right | 1.1 km || 
|-id=651 bgcolor=#d6d6d6
| 584651 ||  || — || February 16, 2015 || Haleakala || Pan-STARRS ||  || align=right | 2.0 km || 
|-id=652 bgcolor=#E9E9E9
| 584652 ||  || — || August 9, 2013 || Kitt Peak || Spacewatch ||  || align=right data-sort-value="0.73" | 730 m || 
|-id=653 bgcolor=#fefefe
| 584653 ||  || — || July 13, 2013 || Haleakala || Pan-STARRS ||  || align=right data-sort-value="0.55" | 550 m || 
|-id=654 bgcolor=#E9E9E9
| 584654 ||  || — || August 27, 2005 || Palomar || NEAT ||  || align=right data-sort-value="0.80" | 800 m || 
|-id=655 bgcolor=#d6d6d6
| 584655 ||  || — || August 10, 2007 || Kitt Peak || Spacewatch ||  || align=right | 1.9 km || 
|-id=656 bgcolor=#E9E9E9
| 584656 ||  || — || January 11, 2011 || Kitt Peak || Spacewatch ||  || align=right | 1.7 km || 
|-id=657 bgcolor=#E9E9E9
| 584657 ||  || — || October 3, 2013 || Haleakala || Pan-STARRS ||  || align=right | 1.3 km || 
|-id=658 bgcolor=#fefefe
| 584658 ||  || — || August 1, 2017 || Haleakala || Pan-STARRS ||  || align=right data-sort-value="0.59" | 590 m || 
|-id=659 bgcolor=#E9E9E9
| 584659 ||  || — || February 21, 2007 || Mount Lemmon || Mount Lemmon Survey ||  || align=right | 1.1 km || 
|-id=660 bgcolor=#E9E9E9
| 584660 ||  || — || March 6, 2011 || Mount Lemmon || Mount Lemmon Survey ||  || align=right | 1.2 km || 
|-id=661 bgcolor=#E9E9E9
| 584661 ||  || — || September 11, 2004 || Kitt Peak || Spacewatch ||  || align=right | 1.6 km || 
|-id=662 bgcolor=#E9E9E9
| 584662 ||  || — || December 11, 2013 || Haleakala || Pan-STARRS ||  || align=right | 2.0 km || 
|-id=663 bgcolor=#E9E9E9
| 584663 ||  || — || November 25, 2013 || Nogales || M. Schwartz, P. R. Holvorcem ||  || align=right | 1.6 km || 
|-id=664 bgcolor=#E9E9E9
| 584664 ||  || — || March 26, 2003 || Palomar || NEAT ||  || align=right | 1.2 km || 
|-id=665 bgcolor=#E9E9E9
| 584665 ||  || — || November 24, 2009 || Kitt Peak || Spacewatch ||  || align=right | 1.4 km || 
|-id=666 bgcolor=#E9E9E9
| 584666 ||  || — || October 26, 2013 || Mount Lemmon || Mount Lemmon Survey ||  || align=right | 1.5 km || 
|-id=667 bgcolor=#E9E9E9
| 584667 ||  || — || November 27, 2013 || Haleakala || Pan-STARRS ||  || align=right | 1.1 km || 
|-id=668 bgcolor=#fefefe
| 584668 ||  || — || October 2, 2010 || Mount Lemmon || Mount Lemmon Survey ||  || align=right data-sort-value="0.79" | 790 m || 
|-id=669 bgcolor=#E9E9E9
| 584669 ||  || — || March 2, 2008 || Kitt Peak || Spacewatch ||  || align=right data-sort-value="0.73" | 730 m || 
|-id=670 bgcolor=#E9E9E9
| 584670 ||  || — || February 5, 2011 || Haleakala || Pan-STARRS ||  || align=right | 1.8 km || 
|-id=671 bgcolor=#E9E9E9
| 584671 ||  || — || September 5, 2008 || Socorro || LINEAR ||  || align=right | 2.5 km || 
|-id=672 bgcolor=#fefefe
| 584672 ||  || — || January 13, 2008 || Kitt Peak || Spacewatch ||  || align=right data-sort-value="0.81" | 810 m || 
|-id=673 bgcolor=#d6d6d6
| 584673 ||  || — || October 21, 2008 || Kitt Peak || Spacewatch ||  || align=right | 1.8 km || 
|-id=674 bgcolor=#E9E9E9
| 584674 ||  || — || March 4, 2011 || Mount Lemmon || Mount Lemmon Survey ||  || align=right | 1.1 km || 
|-id=675 bgcolor=#fefefe
| 584675 ||  || — || July 1, 2013 || Haleakala || Pan-STARRS ||  || align=right data-sort-value="0.80" | 800 m || 
|-id=676 bgcolor=#E9E9E9
| 584676 ||  || — || August 23, 2004 || Kitt Peak || Spacewatch ||  || align=right | 1.5 km || 
|-id=677 bgcolor=#fefefe
| 584677 ||  || — || November 15, 2006 || Kitt Peak || Spacewatch ||  || align=right data-sort-value="0.66" | 660 m || 
|-id=678 bgcolor=#E9E9E9
| 584678 ||  || — || October 3, 2013 || Haleakala || Pan-STARRS ||  || align=right | 1.6 km || 
|-id=679 bgcolor=#d6d6d6
| 584679 ||  || — || August 12, 2017 || Haleakala || Pan-STARRS ||  || align=right | 3.1 km || 
|-id=680 bgcolor=#E9E9E9
| 584680 ||  || — || August 3, 2017 || Haleakala || Pan-STARRS ||  || align=right | 1.2 km || 
|-id=681 bgcolor=#E9E9E9
| 584681 ||  || — || August 4, 2017 || Haleakala || Pan-STARRS ||  || align=right | 1.2 km || 
|-id=682 bgcolor=#d6d6d6
| 584682 ||  || — || August 1, 2017 || Haleakala || Pan-STARRS ||  || align=right | 2.7 km || 
|-id=683 bgcolor=#E9E9E9
| 584683 ||  || — || September 12, 2005 || Kitt Peak || Spacewatch ||  || align=right data-sort-value="0.59" | 590 m || 
|-id=684 bgcolor=#E9E9E9
| 584684 ||  || — || September 20, 2003 || Kitt Peak || Spacewatch ||  || align=right | 2.1 km || 
|-id=685 bgcolor=#fefefe
| 584685 ||  || — || March 8, 2005 || Mount Lemmon || Mount Lemmon Survey ||  || align=right data-sort-value="0.66" | 660 m || 
|-id=686 bgcolor=#E9E9E9
| 584686 ||  || — || August 9, 2013 || Kitt Peak || Spacewatch ||  || align=right data-sort-value="0.68" | 680 m || 
|-id=687 bgcolor=#d6d6d6
| 584687 ||  || — || October 26, 2008 || Mount Lemmon || Mount Lemmon Survey ||  || align=right | 2.3 km || 
|-id=688 bgcolor=#d6d6d6
| 584688 ||  || — || June 5, 2016 || Haleakala || Pan-STARRS ||  || align=right | 2.4 km || 
|-id=689 bgcolor=#E9E9E9
| 584689 ||  || — || April 15, 2007 || Kitt Peak || Spacewatch ||  || align=right | 1.3 km || 
|-id=690 bgcolor=#fefefe
| 584690 ||  || — || October 18, 1998 || Kitt Peak || Spacewatch ||  || align=right data-sort-value="0.68" | 680 m || 
|-id=691 bgcolor=#fefefe
| 584691 ||  || — || April 10, 2013 || Haleakala || Pan-STARRS ||  || align=right data-sort-value="0.52" | 520 m || 
|-id=692 bgcolor=#E9E9E9
| 584692 ||  || — || March 6, 2011 || Kitt Peak || Spacewatch ||  || align=right | 1.7 km || 
|-id=693 bgcolor=#FFC2E0
| 584693 ||  || — || July 27, 2017 || Haleakala || Pan-STARRS || AMO || align=right data-sort-value="0.38" | 380 m || 
|-id=694 bgcolor=#E9E9E9
| 584694 ||  || — || January 2, 2012 || Mount Lemmon || Mount Lemmon Survey ||  || align=right | 1.2 km || 
|-id=695 bgcolor=#E9E9E9
| 584695 ||  || — || August 8, 2013 || Haleakala || Pan-STARRS ||  || align=right data-sort-value="0.78" | 780 m || 
|-id=696 bgcolor=#fefefe
| 584696 ||  || — || February 14, 2012 || Haleakala || Pan-STARRS ||  || align=right data-sort-value="0.72" | 720 m || 
|-id=697 bgcolor=#E9E9E9
| 584697 ||  || — || September 7, 2008 || Mount Lemmon || Mount Lemmon Survey ||  || align=right | 1.6 km || 
|-id=698 bgcolor=#E9E9E9
| 584698 ||  || — || May 29, 2012 || Mount Lemmon || Mount Lemmon Survey ||  || align=right | 1.6 km || 
|-id=699 bgcolor=#E9E9E9
| 584699 ||  || — || March 22, 2012 || Mount Lemmon || Mount Lemmon Survey ||  || align=right data-sort-value="0.79" | 790 m || 
|-id=700 bgcolor=#E9E9E9
| 584700 ||  || — || March 14, 2016 || Mount Lemmon || Mount Lemmon Survey ||  || align=right | 1.9 km || 
|}

584701–584800 

|-bgcolor=#E9E9E9
| 584701 ||  || — || February 9, 2010 || Kitt Peak || Spacewatch ||  || align=right | 1.9 km || 
|-id=702 bgcolor=#fefefe
| 584702 ||  || — || August 23, 2003 || Palomar || NEAT ||  || align=right | 1.1 km || 
|-id=703 bgcolor=#E9E9E9
| 584703 ||  || — || February 10, 2011 || Mount Lemmon || Mount Lemmon Survey ||  || align=right | 1.3 km || 
|-id=704 bgcolor=#E9E9E9
| 584704 ||  || — || February 11, 2011 || Mount Lemmon || Mount Lemmon Survey ||  || align=right data-sort-value="0.92" | 920 m || 
|-id=705 bgcolor=#E9E9E9
| 584705 ||  || — || November 9, 2013 || Oukaimeden || C. Rinner ||  || align=right | 2.1 km || 
|-id=706 bgcolor=#d6d6d6
| 584706 ||  || — || December 21, 2008 || Mount Lemmon || Mount Lemmon Survey ||  || align=right | 3.1 km || 
|-id=707 bgcolor=#fefefe
| 584707 ||  || — || December 12, 2002 || Palomar || NEAT ||  || align=right | 1.0 km || 
|-id=708 bgcolor=#E9E9E9
| 584708 ||  || — || May 22, 2003 || Kitt Peak || Spacewatch ||  || align=right | 2.0 km || 
|-id=709 bgcolor=#E9E9E9
| 584709 ||  || — || August 1, 2009 || Bergisch Gladbach || W. Bickel ||  || align=right | 1.2 km || 
|-id=710 bgcolor=#fefefe
| 584710 ||  || — || November 9, 1999 || Kitt Peak || Spacewatch ||  || align=right data-sort-value="0.61" | 610 m || 
|-id=711 bgcolor=#E9E9E9
| 584711 ||  || — || June 21, 2009 || Mount Lemmon || Mount Lemmon Survey ||  || align=right data-sort-value="0.77" | 770 m || 
|-id=712 bgcolor=#E9E9E9
| 584712 ||  || — || December 10, 2009 || Mount Lemmon || Mount Lemmon Survey ||  || align=right | 1.9 km || 
|-id=713 bgcolor=#d6d6d6
| 584713 ||  || — || July 1, 2017 || Haleakala || Pan-STARRS ||  || align=right | 2.5 km || 
|-id=714 bgcolor=#E9E9E9
| 584714 ||  || — || February 10, 2016 || Haleakala || Pan-STARRS ||  || align=right | 1.8 km || 
|-id=715 bgcolor=#d6d6d6
| 584715 ||  || — || August 6, 2012 || Haleakala || Pan-STARRS ||  || align=right | 2.5 km || 
|-id=716 bgcolor=#fefefe
| 584716 ||  || — || August 27, 2006 || Kitt Peak || Spacewatch ||  || align=right data-sort-value="0.67" | 670 m || 
|-id=717 bgcolor=#d6d6d6
| 584717 ||  || — || October 1, 2008 || Mount Lemmon || Mount Lemmon Survey ||  || align=right | 2.3 km || 
|-id=718 bgcolor=#E9E9E9
| 584718 ||  || — || March 14, 2007 || Mount Lemmon || Mount Lemmon Survey ||  || align=right | 2.0 km || 
|-id=719 bgcolor=#E9E9E9
| 584719 ||  || — || January 19, 2012 || Haleakala || Pan-STARRS ||  || align=right data-sort-value="0.64" | 640 m || 
|-id=720 bgcolor=#E9E9E9
| 584720 ||  || — || January 26, 2006 || Mount Lemmon || Mount Lemmon Survey ||  || align=right | 1.6 km || 
|-id=721 bgcolor=#E9E9E9
| 584721 ||  || — || April 1, 2008 || Kitt Peak || Spacewatch ||  || align=right data-sort-value="0.73" | 730 m || 
|-id=722 bgcolor=#d6d6d6
| 584722 ||  || — || December 4, 2013 || Haleakala || Pan-STARRS ||  || align=right | 3.1 km || 
|-id=723 bgcolor=#E9E9E9
| 584723 ||  || — || January 4, 2011 || Mount Lemmon || Mount Lemmon Survey ||  || align=right | 1.2 km || 
|-id=724 bgcolor=#d6d6d6
| 584724 ||  || — || November 28, 2013 || Mount Lemmon || Mount Lemmon Survey ||  || align=right | 2.4 km || 
|-id=725 bgcolor=#E9E9E9
| 584725 ||  || — || January 11, 2011 || Mount Lemmon || Mount Lemmon Survey ||  || align=right | 1.5 km || 
|-id=726 bgcolor=#E9E9E9
| 584726 ||  || — || February 10, 1999 || Kitt Peak || Spacewatch ||  || align=right | 1.0 km || 
|-id=727 bgcolor=#E9E9E9
| 584727 ||  || — || January 20, 2015 || Haleakala || Pan-STARRS ||  || align=right | 1.7 km || 
|-id=728 bgcolor=#E9E9E9
| 584728 ||  || — || January 10, 2007 || Mount Lemmon || Mount Lemmon Survey ||  || align=right data-sort-value="0.74" | 740 m || 
|-id=729 bgcolor=#E9E9E9
| 584729 ||  || — || August 14, 2013 || Haleakala || Pan-STARRS ||  || align=right data-sort-value="0.71" | 710 m || 
|-id=730 bgcolor=#E9E9E9
| 584730 ||  || — || April 12, 2004 || Kitt Peak || Spacewatch ||  || align=right data-sort-value="0.89" | 890 m || 
|-id=731 bgcolor=#fefefe
| 584731 ||  || — || November 13, 2010 || Mount Lemmon || Mount Lemmon Survey ||  || align=right data-sort-value="0.66" | 660 m || 
|-id=732 bgcolor=#d6d6d6
| 584732 ||  || — || September 28, 2003 || Kitt Peak || Spacewatch ||  || align=right | 2.4 km || 
|-id=733 bgcolor=#E9E9E9
| 584733 ||  || — || September 21, 2008 || Kitt Peak || Spacewatch ||  || align=right | 2.4 km || 
|-id=734 bgcolor=#fefefe
| 584734 ||  || — || September 11, 2007 || Kitt Peak || Spacewatch ||  || align=right data-sort-value="0.58" | 580 m || 
|-id=735 bgcolor=#fefefe
| 584735 ||  || — || March 13, 2012 || Mount Lemmon || Mount Lemmon Survey ||  || align=right data-sort-value="0.82" | 820 m || 
|-id=736 bgcolor=#E9E9E9
| 584736 ||  || — || September 15, 2013 || Catalina || CSS ||  || align=right data-sort-value="0.94" | 940 m || 
|-id=737 bgcolor=#d6d6d6
| 584737 ||  || — || August 26, 2012 || Haleakala || Pan-STARRS ||  || align=right | 2.9 km || 
|-id=738 bgcolor=#E9E9E9
| 584738 ||  || — || October 24, 2013 || Mount Lemmon || Mount Lemmon Survey ||  || align=right | 1.8 km || 
|-id=739 bgcolor=#d6d6d6
| 584739 ||  || — || March 11, 2015 || Mount Lemmon || Mount Lemmon Survey ||  || align=right | 1.9 km || 
|-id=740 bgcolor=#fefefe
| 584740 ||  || — || October 10, 1999 || Kitt Peak || Spacewatch ||  || align=right data-sort-value="0.60" | 600 m || 
|-id=741 bgcolor=#fefefe
| 584741 ||  || — || March 31, 2013 || Kitt Peak || Spacewatch ||  || align=right data-sort-value="0.69" | 690 m || 
|-id=742 bgcolor=#E9E9E9
| 584742 ||  || — || September 13, 2005 || Kitt Peak || Spacewatch ||  || align=right data-sort-value="0.75" | 750 m || 
|-id=743 bgcolor=#d6d6d6
| 584743 ||  || — || September 20, 2007 || Kitt Peak || Spacewatch ||  || align=right | 3.2 km || 
|-id=744 bgcolor=#E9E9E9
| 584744 ||  || — || February 26, 2007 || Mount Lemmon || Mount Lemmon Survey ||  || align=right | 1.6 km || 
|-id=745 bgcolor=#E9E9E9
| 584745 ||  || — || January 31, 2006 || Kitt Peak || Spacewatch ||  || align=right | 2.0 km || 
|-id=746 bgcolor=#E9E9E9
| 584746 ||  || — || March 16, 2007 || Mount Lemmon || Mount Lemmon Survey ||  || align=right | 1.0 km || 
|-id=747 bgcolor=#E9E9E9
| 584747 ||  || — || January 22, 2015 || Haleakala || Pan-STARRS ||  || align=right | 1.9 km || 
|-id=748 bgcolor=#E9E9E9
| 584748 ||  || — || December 25, 2005 || Kitt Peak || Spacewatch ||  || align=right | 1.5 km || 
|-id=749 bgcolor=#E9E9E9
| 584749 ||  || — || September 21, 2009 || Mount Lemmon || Mount Lemmon Survey ||  || align=right data-sort-value="0.74" | 740 m || 
|-id=750 bgcolor=#fefefe
| 584750 ||  || — || August 22, 2003 || Palomar || NEAT ||  || align=right data-sort-value="0.60" | 600 m || 
|-id=751 bgcolor=#fefefe
| 584751 ||  || — || September 8, 2010 || Kitt Peak || Spacewatch ||  || align=right data-sort-value="0.66" | 660 m || 
|-id=752 bgcolor=#E9E9E9
| 584752 ||  || — || March 2, 2011 || Mount Lemmon || Mount Lemmon Survey ||  || align=right | 1.5 km || 
|-id=753 bgcolor=#E9E9E9
| 584753 ||  || — || March 1, 2012 || Mount Lemmon || Mount Lemmon Survey ||  || align=right data-sort-value="0.96" | 960 m || 
|-id=754 bgcolor=#fefefe
| 584754 ||  || — || August 31, 2014 || Haleakala || Pan-STARRS ||  || align=right data-sort-value="0.59" | 590 m || 
|-id=755 bgcolor=#E9E9E9
| 584755 ||  || — || July 27, 1995 || Kitt Peak || Spacewatch ||  || align=right | 1.5 km || 
|-id=756 bgcolor=#E9E9E9
| 584756 ||  || — || January 15, 2015 || Haleakala || Pan-STARRS ||  || align=right | 2.1 km || 
|-id=757 bgcolor=#d6d6d6
| 584757 ||  || — || August 24, 2012 || Kitt Peak || Spacewatch ||  || align=right | 2.9 km || 
|-id=758 bgcolor=#E9E9E9
| 584758 ||  || — || September 1, 2013 || Mount Lemmon || Mount Lemmon Survey ||  || align=right data-sort-value="0.83" | 830 m || 
|-id=759 bgcolor=#E9E9E9
| 584759 ||  || — || September 18, 2003 || Kitt Peak || Spacewatch ||  || align=right | 1.9 km || 
|-id=760 bgcolor=#d6d6d6
| 584760 ||  || — || December 7, 2013 || Nogales || M. Schwartz, P. R. Holvorcem ||  || align=right | 2.9 km || 
|-id=761 bgcolor=#E9E9E9
| 584761 ||  || — || September 2, 2005 || Palomar || NEAT ||  || align=right | 1.0 km || 
|-id=762 bgcolor=#E9E9E9
| 584762 ||  || — || May 16, 2012 || Haleakala || Pan-STARRS ||  || align=right | 1.7 km || 
|-id=763 bgcolor=#fefefe
| 584763 ||  || — || May 16, 2005 || Palomar || NEAT ||  || align=right | 1.1 km || 
|-id=764 bgcolor=#d6d6d6
| 584764 ||  || — || June 18, 2005 || Mount Lemmon || Mount Lemmon Survey ||  || align=right | 2.9 km || 
|-id=765 bgcolor=#E9E9E9
| 584765 ||  || — || August 24, 2017 || Haleakala || Pan-STARRS ||  || align=right | 1.2 km || 
|-id=766 bgcolor=#E9E9E9
| 584766 ||  || — || August 31, 2017 || Mount Lemmon || Mount Lemmon Survey ||  || align=right | 1.3 km || 
|-id=767 bgcolor=#d6d6d6
| 584767 ||  || — || August 23, 2017 || Haleakala || Pan-STARRS ||  || align=right | 2.7 km || 
|-id=768 bgcolor=#d6d6d6
| 584768 ||  || — || August 23, 2017 || Haleakala || Pan-STARRS ||  || align=right | 2.1 km || 
|-id=769 bgcolor=#FA8072
| 584769 ||  || — || March 9, 2011 || Kitt Peak || Spacewatch || H || align=right data-sort-value="0.52" | 520 m || 
|-id=770 bgcolor=#E9E9E9
| 584770 ||  || — || October 26, 2008 || Catalina || CSS ||  || align=right | 2.7 km || 
|-id=771 bgcolor=#d6d6d6
| 584771 ||  || — || March 13, 2010 || Mount Lemmon || Mount Lemmon Survey ||  || align=right | 1.8 km || 
|-id=772 bgcolor=#E9E9E9
| 584772 ||  || — || September 15, 2009 || Kitt Peak || Spacewatch ||  || align=right data-sort-value="0.87" | 870 m || 
|-id=773 bgcolor=#d6d6d6
| 584773 ||  || — || October 15, 2012 || Haleakala || Pan-STARRS ||  || align=right | 2.3 km || 
|-id=774 bgcolor=#E9E9E9
| 584774 ||  || — || October 7, 2008 || Mount Lemmon || Mount Lemmon Survey ||  || align=right | 1.8 km || 
|-id=775 bgcolor=#E9E9E9
| 584775 ||  || — || December 28, 2005 || Kitt Peak || Spacewatch ||  || align=right | 1.1 km || 
|-id=776 bgcolor=#d6d6d6
| 584776 ||  || — || August 24, 2017 || Haleakala || Pan-STARRS ||  || align=right | 2.8 km || 
|-id=777 bgcolor=#E9E9E9
| 584777 ||  || — || October 27, 2005 || Kitt Peak || Spacewatch ||  || align=right data-sort-value="0.78" | 780 m || 
|-id=778 bgcolor=#C2E0FF
| 584778 ||  || — || August 6, 2017 || Haleakala || Pan-STARRS || centaurcritical || align=right | 24 km || 
|-id=779 bgcolor=#d6d6d6
| 584779 ||  || — || December 21, 2008 || Mount Lemmon || Mount Lemmon Survey ||  || align=right | 2.2 km || 
|-id=780 bgcolor=#d6d6d6
| 584780 ||  || — || September 16, 2012 || Mount Lemmon || Mount Lemmon Survey ||  || align=right | 2.4 km || 
|-id=781 bgcolor=#E9E9E9
| 584781 ||  || — || September 20, 2009 || Mount Lemmon || Mount Lemmon Survey ||  || align=right | 1.4 km || 
|-id=782 bgcolor=#d6d6d6
| 584782 ||  || — || February 9, 2003 || Palomar || NEAT ||  || align=right | 4.0 km || 
|-id=783 bgcolor=#E9E9E9
| 584783 ||  || — || April 8, 2002 || Kitt Peak || Spacewatch ||  || align=right | 1.7 km || 
|-id=784 bgcolor=#E9E9E9
| 584784 ||  || — || October 16, 2013 || Mount Lemmon || Mount Lemmon Survey ||  || align=right | 1.6 km || 
|-id=785 bgcolor=#E9E9E9
| 584785 ||  || — || February 27, 2012 || Haleakala || Pan-STARRS ||  || align=right | 1.0 km || 
|-id=786 bgcolor=#d6d6d6
| 584786 ||  || — || April 11, 2005 || Mount Lemmon || Mount Lemmon Survey ||  || align=right | 2.8 km || 
|-id=787 bgcolor=#E9E9E9
| 584787 ||  || — || November 27, 2013 || Mount Lemmon || Mount Lemmon Survey ||  || align=right | 2.3 km || 
|-id=788 bgcolor=#E9E9E9
| 584788 ||  || — || September 17, 2009 || Kitt Peak || Spacewatch ||  || align=right data-sort-value="0.92" | 920 m || 
|-id=789 bgcolor=#fefefe
| 584789 ||  || — || July 13, 2013 || Mount Lemmon || Mount Lemmon Survey ||  || align=right data-sort-value="0.74" | 740 m || 
|-id=790 bgcolor=#fefefe
| 584790 ||  || — || October 14, 2007 || Mount Lemmon || Mount Lemmon Survey ||  || align=right data-sort-value="0.70" | 700 m || 
|-id=791 bgcolor=#E9E9E9
| 584791 ||  || — || January 14, 2011 || Mount Lemmon || Mount Lemmon Survey ||  || align=right | 1.4 km || 
|-id=792 bgcolor=#E9E9E9
| 584792 ||  || — || March 10, 2007 || Mount Lemmon || Mount Lemmon Survey ||  || align=right | 1.3 km || 
|-id=793 bgcolor=#fefefe
| 584793 ||  || — || January 18, 2012 || Mount Lemmon || Mount Lemmon Survey ||  || align=right data-sort-value="0.71" | 710 m || 
|-id=794 bgcolor=#E9E9E9
| 584794 ||  || — || October 26, 2009 || Bisei SG Center || S. Okumura, T. Sakamoto ||  || align=right | 1.1 km || 
|-id=795 bgcolor=#E9E9E9
| 584795 ||  || — || August 7, 2008 || Kitt Peak || Spacewatch ||  || align=right | 2.1 km || 
|-id=796 bgcolor=#E9E9E9
| 584796 ||  || — || October 24, 2009 || Kitt Peak || Spacewatch ||  || align=right | 1.0 km || 
|-id=797 bgcolor=#fefefe
| 584797 ||  || — || May 1, 2013 || Mount Lemmon || Mount Lemmon Survey ||  || align=right data-sort-value="0.51" | 510 m || 
|-id=798 bgcolor=#E9E9E9
| 584798 ||  || — || November 17, 2009 || Mount Lemmon || Mount Lemmon Survey ||  || align=right | 1.4 km || 
|-id=799 bgcolor=#E9E9E9
| 584799 ||  || — || September 28, 2000 || Kitt Peak || Spacewatch ||  || align=right | 1.2 km || 
|-id=800 bgcolor=#E9E9E9
| 584800 ||  || — || February 15, 2015 || Haleakala || Pan-STARRS ||  || align=right | 1.4 km || 
|}

584801–584900 

|-bgcolor=#d6d6d6
| 584801 ||  || — || October 10, 2012 || Mount Lemmon || Mount Lemmon Survey ||  || align=right | 2.9 km || 
|-id=802 bgcolor=#E9E9E9
| 584802 ||  || — || May 6, 2011 || Kitt Peak || Spacewatch ||  || align=right | 1.8 km || 
|-id=803 bgcolor=#E9E9E9
| 584803 ||  || — || March 2, 2006 || Kitt Peak || Spacewatch ||  || align=right | 2.1 km || 
|-id=804 bgcolor=#FA8072
| 584804 ||  || — || February 15, 2013 || ESA OGS || ESA OGS ||  || align=right data-sort-value="0.62" | 620 m || 
|-id=805 bgcolor=#fefefe
| 584805 ||  || — || February 25, 2009 || Calar Alto || F. Hormuth ||  || align=right data-sort-value="0.55" | 550 m || 
|-id=806 bgcolor=#fefefe
| 584806 ||  || — || March 2, 2006 || Kitt Peak || Spacewatch ||  || align=right data-sort-value="0.53" | 530 m || 
|-id=807 bgcolor=#E9E9E9
| 584807 ||  || — || October 13, 2013 || Oukaimeden || C. Rinner ||  || align=right | 1.3 km || 
|-id=808 bgcolor=#d6d6d6
| 584808 ||  || — || September 13, 2007 || Mount Lemmon || Mount Lemmon Survey ||  || align=right | 2.2 km || 
|-id=809 bgcolor=#fefefe
| 584809 ||  || — || November 1, 2010 || Mount Lemmon || Mount Lemmon Survey ||  || align=right data-sort-value="0.59" | 590 m || 
|-id=810 bgcolor=#E9E9E9
| 584810 ||  || — || September 6, 2008 || Mount Lemmon || Mount Lemmon Survey ||  || align=right | 1.6 km || 
|-id=811 bgcolor=#E9E9E9
| 584811 ||  || — || September 16, 2004 || Kitt Peak || Spacewatch ||  || align=right | 1.3 km || 
|-id=812 bgcolor=#d6d6d6
| 584812 ||  || — || November 3, 1996 || Kitt Peak || Spacewatch ||  || align=right | 1.8 km || 
|-id=813 bgcolor=#d6d6d6
| 584813 ||  || — || September 10, 2007 || Mount Lemmon || Mount Lemmon Survey ||  || align=right | 2.1 km || 
|-id=814 bgcolor=#E9E9E9
| 584814 ||  || — || February 5, 2011 || Haleakala || Pan-STARRS ||  || align=right data-sort-value="0.95" | 950 m || 
|-id=815 bgcolor=#E9E9E9
| 584815 ||  || — || March 11, 2003 || Palomar || NEAT ||  || align=right | 1.5 km || 
|-id=816 bgcolor=#fefefe
| 584816 ||  || — || February 13, 2008 || Kitt Peak || Spacewatch ||  || align=right data-sort-value="0.76" | 760 m || 
|-id=817 bgcolor=#E9E9E9
| 584817 ||  || — || March 3, 2006 || Kitt Peak || Spacewatch ||  || align=right | 1.6 km || 
|-id=818 bgcolor=#fefefe
| 584818 ||  || — || March 26, 2007 || Kitt Peak || Spacewatch ||  || align=right data-sort-value="0.40" | 400 m || 
|-id=819 bgcolor=#E9E9E9
| 584819 ||  || — || March 1, 2011 || Mount Lemmon || Mount Lemmon Survey ||  || align=right | 1.3 km || 
|-id=820 bgcolor=#E9E9E9
| 584820 ||  || — || December 13, 2004 || Mauna Kea || Mauna Kea Obs. ||  || align=right | 1.1 km || 
|-id=821 bgcolor=#E9E9E9
| 584821 ||  || — || September 17, 1995 || Kitt Peak || Spacewatch ||  || align=right | 1.5 km || 
|-id=822 bgcolor=#E9E9E9
| 584822 ||  || — || October 5, 2013 || Haleakala || Pan-STARRS ||  || align=right | 1.1 km || 
|-id=823 bgcolor=#fefefe
| 584823 ||  || — || January 14, 2011 || Kitt Peak || Spacewatch ||  || align=right data-sort-value="0.64" | 640 m || 
|-id=824 bgcolor=#d6d6d6
| 584824 ||  || — || November 30, 2008 || Mount Lemmon || Mount Lemmon Survey ||  || align=right | 2.4 km || 
|-id=825 bgcolor=#E9E9E9
| 584825 ||  || — || February 10, 2015 || Mount Lemmon || Mount Lemmon Survey ||  || align=right | 1.2 km || 
|-id=826 bgcolor=#d6d6d6
| 584826 ||  || — || September 18, 2007 || Kitt Peak || Spacewatch ||  || align=right | 2.5 km || 
|-id=827 bgcolor=#E9E9E9
| 584827 ||  || — || October 5, 2013 || Haleakala || Pan-STARRS ||  || align=right data-sort-value="0.99" | 990 m || 
|-id=828 bgcolor=#d6d6d6
| 584828 ||  || — || August 29, 2006 || Kitt Peak || Spacewatch ||  || align=right | 2.5 km || 
|-id=829 bgcolor=#d6d6d6
| 584829 ||  || — || October 18, 2012 || Haleakala || Pan-STARRS ||  || align=right | 2.7 km || 
|-id=830 bgcolor=#fefefe
| 584830 ||  || — || August 29, 2013 || Haleakala || Pan-STARRS ||  || align=right data-sort-value="0.76" | 760 m || 
|-id=831 bgcolor=#E9E9E9
| 584831 ||  || — || February 21, 2006 || Mount Lemmon || Mount Lemmon Survey ||  || align=right | 1.9 km || 
|-id=832 bgcolor=#E9E9E9
| 584832 ||  || — || October 3, 2013 || Haleakala || Pan-STARRS ||  || align=right data-sort-value="0.95" | 950 m || 
|-id=833 bgcolor=#d6d6d6
| 584833 ||  || — || October 21, 2012 || Mount Lemmon || Mount Lemmon Survey ||  || align=right | 2.0 km || 
|-id=834 bgcolor=#fefefe
| 584834 ||  || — || September 13, 2007 || Catalina || CSS ||  || align=right data-sort-value="0.68" | 680 m || 
|-id=835 bgcolor=#E9E9E9
| 584835 ||  || — || October 23, 2009 || Kitt Peak || Spacewatch ||  || align=right data-sort-value="0.75" | 750 m || 
|-id=836 bgcolor=#E9E9E9
| 584836 ||  || — || March 9, 2007 || Mount Lemmon || Mount Lemmon Survey ||  || align=right data-sort-value="0.92" | 920 m || 
|-id=837 bgcolor=#d6d6d6
| 584837 ||  || — || April 24, 2006 || Kitt Peak || Spacewatch ||  || align=right | 2.4 km || 
|-id=838 bgcolor=#E9E9E9
| 584838 ||  || — || November 16, 1995 || Kitt Peak || Spacewatch ||  || align=right | 1.7 km || 
|-id=839 bgcolor=#E9E9E9
| 584839 ||  || — || March 14, 2007 || Kitt Peak || Spacewatch ||  || align=right | 1.9 km || 
|-id=840 bgcolor=#E9E9E9
| 584840 ||  || — || November 9, 2009 || Kitt Peak || Spacewatch ||  || align=right | 1.2 km || 
|-id=841 bgcolor=#E9E9E9
| 584841 ||  || — || February 5, 2011 || Haleakala || Pan-STARRS ||  || align=right | 1.3 km || 
|-id=842 bgcolor=#d6d6d6
| 584842 ||  || — || September 16, 2012 || Kitt Peak || Spacewatch ||  || align=right | 2.4 km || 
|-id=843 bgcolor=#E9E9E9
| 584843 ||  || — || August 22, 2004 || Kitt Peak || Spacewatch ||  || align=right | 1.3 km || 
|-id=844 bgcolor=#d6d6d6
| 584844 ||  || — || September 17, 2012 || Mount Lemmon || Mount Lemmon Survey ||  || align=right | 2.0 km || 
|-id=845 bgcolor=#E9E9E9
| 584845 ||  || — || September 7, 2008 || Mount Lemmon || Mount Lemmon Survey ||  || align=right | 1.8 km || 
|-id=846 bgcolor=#d6d6d6
| 584846 ||  || — || February 26, 2009 || Mount Lemmon || Mount Lemmon Survey ||  || align=right | 1.8 km || 
|-id=847 bgcolor=#d6d6d6
| 584847 ||  || — || October 7, 2007 || Mount Lemmon || Mount Lemmon Survey ||  || align=right | 2.1 km || 
|-id=848 bgcolor=#fefefe
| 584848 ||  || — || January 29, 2012 || Mount Lemmon || Mount Lemmon Survey ||  || align=right data-sort-value="0.69" | 690 m || 
|-id=849 bgcolor=#d6d6d6
| 584849 ||  || — || October 20, 2003 || Kitt Peak || Spacewatch ||  || align=right | 2.0 km || 
|-id=850 bgcolor=#E9E9E9
| 584850 ||  || — || April 20, 2012 || Kitt Peak || Spacewatch ||  || align=right data-sort-value="0.89" | 890 m || 
|-id=851 bgcolor=#E9E9E9
| 584851 ||  || — || April 24, 2012 || Mount Lemmon || Mount Lemmon Survey ||  || align=right | 1.3 km || 
|-id=852 bgcolor=#d6d6d6
| 584852 ||  || — || February 24, 2009 || Mount Lemmon || Mount Lemmon Survey ||  || align=right | 2.8 km || 
|-id=853 bgcolor=#E9E9E9
| 584853 ||  || — || September 23, 2009 || Mount Lemmon || Mount Lemmon Survey ||  || align=right data-sort-value="0.75" | 750 m || 
|-id=854 bgcolor=#E9E9E9
| 584854 ||  || — || October 3, 2013 || Mount Lemmon || Mount Lemmon Survey ||  || align=right | 1.2 km || 
|-id=855 bgcolor=#E9E9E9
| 584855 ||  || — || August 15, 2004 || Cerro Tololo || Cerro Tololo Obs. ||  || align=right | 1.6 km || 
|-id=856 bgcolor=#E9E9E9
| 584856 ||  || — || October 25, 2013 || Mount Lemmon || Mount Lemmon Survey ||  || align=right | 1.1 km || 
|-id=857 bgcolor=#E9E9E9
| 584857 ||  || — || January 14, 2011 || Mount Lemmon || Mount Lemmon Survey ||  || align=right data-sort-value="0.89" | 890 m || 
|-id=858 bgcolor=#E9E9E9
| 584858 ||  || — || December 26, 2005 || Mount Lemmon || Mount Lemmon Survey ||  || align=right | 1.1 km || 
|-id=859 bgcolor=#E9E9E9
| 584859 ||  || — || April 20, 2007 || Mount Lemmon || Mount Lemmon Survey ||  || align=right | 1.1 km || 
|-id=860 bgcolor=#d6d6d6
| 584860 ||  || — || October 2, 2006 || Mount Lemmon || Mount Lemmon Survey ||  || align=right | 2.8 km || 
|-id=861 bgcolor=#E9E9E9
| 584861 ||  || — || September 20, 2008 || Mount Lemmon || Mount Lemmon Survey ||  || align=right | 1.7 km || 
|-id=862 bgcolor=#E9E9E9
| 584862 ||  || — || April 1, 2003 || Palomar || NEAT ||  || align=right | 1.3 km || 
|-id=863 bgcolor=#d6d6d6
| 584863 ||  || — || October 16, 2012 || Mount Lemmon || Mount Lemmon Survey ||  || align=right | 2.8 km || 
|-id=864 bgcolor=#fefefe
| 584864 ||  || — || October 2, 2014 || Kitt Peak || Spacewatch ||  || align=right data-sort-value="0.50" | 500 m || 
|-id=865 bgcolor=#fefefe
| 584865 ||  || — || April 13, 2004 || Kitt Peak || Spacewatch ||  || align=right data-sort-value="0.83" | 830 m || 
|-id=866 bgcolor=#E9E9E9
| 584866 ||  || — || February 10, 2011 || Mount Lemmon || Mount Lemmon Survey ||  || align=right | 1.7 km || 
|-id=867 bgcolor=#d6d6d6
| 584867 ||  || — || December 30, 2008 || Kitt Peak || Spacewatch ||  || align=right | 2.4 km || 
|-id=868 bgcolor=#E9E9E9
| 584868 ||  || — || September 3, 2008 || Kitt Peak || Spacewatch ||  || align=right | 1.8 km || 
|-id=869 bgcolor=#E9E9E9
| 584869 ||  || — || January 30, 2006 || Kitt Peak || Spacewatch ||  || align=right | 2.2 km || 
|-id=870 bgcolor=#E9E9E9
| 584870 ||  || — || February 9, 2010 || Mount Lemmon || Mount Lemmon Survey ||  || align=right | 2.0 km || 
|-id=871 bgcolor=#E9E9E9
| 584871 ||  || — || November 27, 2013 || Haleakala || Pan-STARRS ||  || align=right | 1.6 km || 
|-id=872 bgcolor=#E9E9E9
| 584872 ||  || — || December 14, 2013 || Mount Lemmon || Mount Lemmon Survey ||  || align=right | 1.7 km || 
|-id=873 bgcolor=#E9E9E9
| 584873 ||  || — || November 1, 2005 || Kitt Peak || Spacewatch ||  || align=right data-sort-value="0.69" | 690 m || 
|-id=874 bgcolor=#E9E9E9
| 584874 ||  || — || September 21, 2009 || Mount Lemmon || Mount Lemmon Survey ||  || align=right data-sort-value="0.72" | 720 m || 
|-id=875 bgcolor=#E9E9E9
| 584875 ||  || — || November 23, 2009 || Kitt Peak || Spacewatch ||  || align=right | 1.2 km || 
|-id=876 bgcolor=#E9E9E9
| 584876 ||  || — || September 23, 2004 || Kitt Peak || Spacewatch ||  || align=right | 1.5 km || 
|-id=877 bgcolor=#E9E9E9
| 584877 ||  || — || April 25, 2003 || Kitt Peak || Spacewatch ||  || align=right | 1.5 km || 
|-id=878 bgcolor=#E9E9E9
| 584878 ||  || — || January 28, 2015 || Haleakala || Pan-STARRS ||  || align=right | 2.6 km || 
|-id=879 bgcolor=#d6d6d6
| 584879 ||  || — || October 9, 2007 || Mount Lemmon || Mount Lemmon Survey ||  || align=right | 2.1 km || 
|-id=880 bgcolor=#E9E9E9
| 584880 ||  || — || January 31, 2006 || Kitt Peak || Spacewatch ||  || align=right | 1.6 km || 
|-id=881 bgcolor=#E9E9E9
| 584881 ||  || — || March 10, 2007 || Kitt Peak || Spacewatch ||  || align=right | 1.3 km || 
|-id=882 bgcolor=#E9E9E9
| 584882 ||  || — || October 6, 2004 || Kitt Peak || Spacewatch ||  || align=right | 1.2 km || 
|-id=883 bgcolor=#E9E9E9
| 584883 ||  || — || January 30, 2006 || Kitt Peak || Spacewatch ||  || align=right | 1.6 km || 
|-id=884 bgcolor=#E9E9E9
| 584884 ||  || — || October 15, 2004 || Mount Lemmon || Mount Lemmon Survey ||  || align=right | 1.5 km || 
|-id=885 bgcolor=#fefefe
| 584885 ||  || — || August 8, 2013 || Haleakala || Pan-STARRS ||  || align=right data-sort-value="0.46" | 460 m || 
|-id=886 bgcolor=#E9E9E9
| 584886 ||  || — || January 20, 2015 || Haleakala || Pan-STARRS ||  || align=right | 1.1 km || 
|-id=887 bgcolor=#E9E9E9
| 584887 ||  || — || December 30, 2005 || Kitt Peak || Spacewatch ||  || align=right | 1.5 km || 
|-id=888 bgcolor=#E9E9E9
| 584888 ||  || — || October 19, 1999 || Kitt Peak || Spacewatch ||  || align=right | 1.9 km || 
|-id=889 bgcolor=#E9E9E9
| 584889 ||  || — || October 3, 2013 || Mount Lemmon || Mount Lemmon Survey ||  || align=right data-sort-value="0.63" | 630 m || 
|-id=890 bgcolor=#E9E9E9
| 584890 ||  || — || February 16, 2010 || Mount Lemmon || Mount Lemmon Survey ||  || align=right | 1.6 km || 
|-id=891 bgcolor=#E9E9E9
| 584891 ||  || — || October 3, 2013 || Mount Lemmon || Mount Lemmon Survey ||  || align=right data-sort-value="0.70" | 700 m || 
|-id=892 bgcolor=#E9E9E9
| 584892 ||  || — || October 2, 2000 || Anderson Mesa || LONEOS ||  || align=right | 1.6 km || 
|-id=893 bgcolor=#d6d6d6
| 584893 ||  || — || October 11, 2012 || Haleakala || Pan-STARRS ||  || align=right | 2.2 km || 
|-id=894 bgcolor=#E9E9E9
| 584894 ||  || — || October 2, 2008 || Kitt Peak || Spacewatch ||  || align=right | 1.8 km || 
|-id=895 bgcolor=#E9E9E9
| 584895 ||  || — || July 14, 2013 || Haleakala || Pan-STARRS ||  || align=right | 1.4 km || 
|-id=896 bgcolor=#fefefe
| 584896 ||  || — || September 2, 2017 || Haleakala || Pan-STARRS || H || align=right data-sort-value="0.49" | 490 m || 
|-id=897 bgcolor=#E9E9E9
| 584897 ||  || — || February 23, 2015 || Haleakala || Pan-STARRS ||  || align=right data-sort-value="0.97" | 970 m || 
|-id=898 bgcolor=#E9E9E9
| 584898 ||  || — || August 21, 2000 || Anderson Mesa || LONEOS ||  || align=right | 1.4 km || 
|-id=899 bgcolor=#d6d6d6
| 584899 ||  || — || September 16, 2006 || Catalina || CSS ||  || align=right | 3.1 km || 
|-id=900 bgcolor=#E9E9E9
| 584900 ||  || — || July 16, 2008 || Charleston || R. Holmes ||  || align=right | 2.1 km || 
|}

584901–585000 

|-bgcolor=#E9E9E9
| 584901 ||  || — || March 3, 2016 || Haleakala || Pan-STARRS ||  || align=right data-sort-value="0.83" | 830 m || 
|-id=902 bgcolor=#E9E9E9
| 584902 ||  || — || November 9, 2013 || Mount Lemmon || Mount Lemmon Survey ||  || align=right | 1.1 km || 
|-id=903 bgcolor=#E9E9E9
| 584903 ||  || — || January 26, 2015 || Haleakala || Pan-STARRS ||  || align=right | 1.3 km || 
|-id=904 bgcolor=#E9E9E9
| 584904 ||  || — || February 14, 2005 || Catalina || CSS ||  || align=right | 2.1 km || 
|-id=905 bgcolor=#d6d6d6
| 584905 ||  || — || December 29, 2003 || Kitt Peak || Spacewatch ||  || align=right | 2.5 km || 
|-id=906 bgcolor=#d6d6d6
| 584906 ||  || — || September 14, 2017 || Haleakala || Pan-STARRS ||  || align=right | 2.3 km || 
|-id=907 bgcolor=#E9E9E9
| 584907 ||  || — || September 12, 2017 || Haleakala || Pan-STARRS ||  || align=right | 2.4 km || 
|-id=908 bgcolor=#fefefe
| 584908 ||  || — || September 2, 2017 || Haleakala || Pan-STARRS ||  || align=right data-sort-value="0.54" | 540 m || 
|-id=909 bgcolor=#E9E9E9
| 584909 ||  || — || October 21, 2008 || Mount Lemmon || Mount Lemmon Survey ||  || align=right | 1.6 km || 
|-id=910 bgcolor=#E9E9E9
| 584910 ||  || — || November 9, 2013 || Mount Lemmon || Mount Lemmon Survey ||  || align=right | 1.3 km || 
|-id=911 bgcolor=#E9E9E9
| 584911 ||  || — || January 27, 2015 || Haleakala || Pan-STARRS ||  || align=right | 1.7 km || 
|-id=912 bgcolor=#E9E9E9
| 584912 ||  || — || September 16, 2017 || Haleakala || Pan-STARRS ||  || align=right | 2.0 km || 
|-id=913 bgcolor=#E9E9E9
| 584913 ||  || — || November 10, 2013 || Kitt Peak || Spacewatch ||  || align=right | 1.5 km || 
|-id=914 bgcolor=#E9E9E9
| 584914 ||  || — || December 31, 2013 || Mayhill-ISON || L. Elenin ||  || align=right | 2.2 km || 
|-id=915 bgcolor=#FA8072
| 584915 ||  || — || June 3, 2011 || Mount Lemmon || Mount Lemmon Survey || H || align=right data-sort-value="0.57" | 570 m || 
|-id=916 bgcolor=#E9E9E9
| 584916 ||  || — || October 1, 2008 || Mount Lemmon || Mount Lemmon Survey ||  || align=right | 2.0 km || 
|-id=917 bgcolor=#d6d6d6
| 584917 ||  || — || August 27, 2000 || Cerro Tololo || R. Millis, L. H. Wasserman ||  || align=right | 2.5 km || 
|-id=918 bgcolor=#E9E9E9
| 584918 ||  || — || April 20, 2012 || Mount Lemmon || Mount Lemmon Survey ||  || align=right data-sort-value="0.64" | 640 m || 
|-id=919 bgcolor=#d6d6d6
| 584919 ||  || — || July 19, 2007 || Mount Lemmon || Mount Lemmon Survey ||  || align=right | 2.0 km || 
|-id=920 bgcolor=#E9E9E9
| 584920 ||  || — || March 20, 2002 || Kitt Peak || Kitt Peak Obs. ||  || align=right | 1.3 km || 
|-id=921 bgcolor=#E9E9E9
| 584921 ||  || — || March 21, 2015 || Haleakala || Pan-STARRS ||  || align=right | 1.8 km || 
|-id=922 bgcolor=#E9E9E9
| 584922 ||  || — || April 28, 2011 || Mount Lemmon || Mount Lemmon Survey ||  || align=right | 1.6 km || 
|-id=923 bgcolor=#E9E9E9
| 584923 ||  || — || April 21, 2012 || Mount Lemmon || Mount Lemmon Survey ||  || align=right | 1.2 km || 
|-id=924 bgcolor=#d6d6d6
| 584924 ||  || — || November 7, 2007 || Kitt Peak || Spacewatch ||  || align=right | 2.1 km || 
|-id=925 bgcolor=#d6d6d6
| 584925 ||  || — || October 23, 2003 || Kitt Peak || L. H. Wasserman, D. E. Trilling ||  || align=right | 2.1 km || 
|-id=926 bgcolor=#E9E9E9
| 584926 ||  || — || September 28, 2008 || Mount Lemmon || Mount Lemmon Survey ||  || align=right | 1.7 km || 
|-id=927 bgcolor=#E9E9E9
| 584927 ||  || — || November 27, 2013 || Haleakala || Pan-STARRS ||  || align=right data-sort-value="0.99" | 990 m || 
|-id=928 bgcolor=#E9E9E9
| 584928 ||  || — || October 26, 2013 || Mount Lemmon || Mount Lemmon Survey ||  || align=right | 1.4 km || 
|-id=929 bgcolor=#E9E9E9
| 584929 ||  || — || November 20, 2009 || Kitt Peak || Spacewatch ||  || align=right | 1.9 km || 
|-id=930 bgcolor=#d6d6d6
| 584930 ||  || — || August 2, 2011 || Haleakala || Pan-STARRS ||  || align=right | 2.6 km || 
|-id=931 bgcolor=#E9E9E9
| 584931 ||  || — || April 12, 2016 || Haleakala || Pan-STARRS ||  || align=right | 1.3 km || 
|-id=932 bgcolor=#E9E9E9
| 584932 ||  || — || January 22, 2015 || Haleakala || Pan-STARRS ||  || align=right | 2.0 km || 
|-id=933 bgcolor=#E9E9E9
| 584933 ||  || — || June 15, 2004 || Socorro || LINEAR ||  || align=right | 1.6 km || 
|-id=934 bgcolor=#E9E9E9
| 584934 ||  || — || January 13, 2015 || Haleakala || Pan-STARRS ||  || align=right | 1.9 km || 
|-id=935 bgcolor=#E9E9E9
| 584935 ||  || — || September 5, 2008 || Kitt Peak || Spacewatch ||  || align=right | 1.7 km || 
|-id=936 bgcolor=#d6d6d6
| 584936 ||  || — || July 12, 2016 || Mount Lemmon || Mount Lemmon Survey ||  || align=right | 2.2 km || 
|-id=937 bgcolor=#d6d6d6
| 584937 ||  || — || September 25, 2011 || Haleakala || Pan-STARRS ||  || align=right | 2.6 km || 
|-id=938 bgcolor=#E9E9E9
| 584938 ||  || — || October 30, 2009 || Mount Lemmon || Mount Lemmon Survey ||  || align=right | 1.2 km || 
|-id=939 bgcolor=#d6d6d6
| 584939 ||  || — || December 30, 2008 || Mount Lemmon || Mount Lemmon Survey ||  || align=right | 2.2 km || 
|-id=940 bgcolor=#E9E9E9
| 584940 ||  || — || September 26, 2013 || Mount Lemmon || Mount Lemmon Survey ||  || align=right data-sort-value="0.83" | 830 m || 
|-id=941 bgcolor=#E9E9E9
| 584941 ||  || — || November 10, 2013 || Mount Lemmon || Mount Lemmon Survey ||  || align=right | 1.6 km || 
|-id=942 bgcolor=#d6d6d6
| 584942 ||  || — || January 17, 2008 || Kitt Peak || Spacewatch ||  || align=right | 2.5 km || 
|-id=943 bgcolor=#E9E9E9
| 584943 ||  || — || September 10, 2013 || Haleakala || Pan-STARRS ||  || align=right | 1.1 km || 
|-id=944 bgcolor=#d6d6d6
| 584944 ||  || — || February 4, 2000 || Kitt Peak || Spacewatch ||  || align=right | 2.7 km || 
|-id=945 bgcolor=#d6d6d6
| 584945 ||  || — || October 15, 2007 || Kitt Peak || Spacewatch ||  || align=right | 2.1 km || 
|-id=946 bgcolor=#E9E9E9
| 584946 ||  || — || October 3, 2013 || Kitt Peak || Spacewatch ||  || align=right | 1.3 km || 
|-id=947 bgcolor=#E9E9E9
| 584947 ||  || — || September 23, 2004 || Kitt Peak || Spacewatch ||  || align=right | 1.4 km || 
|-id=948 bgcolor=#E9E9E9
| 584948 ||  || — || July 16, 2013 || Haleakala || Pan-STARRS ||  || align=right | 1.6 km || 
|-id=949 bgcolor=#E9E9E9
| 584949 ||  || — || August 16, 2017 || Haleakala || Pan-STARRS ||  || align=right | 1.3 km || 
|-id=950 bgcolor=#E9E9E9
| 584950 ||  || — || October 27, 2005 || Kitt Peak || Spacewatch ||  || align=right data-sort-value="0.86" | 860 m || 
|-id=951 bgcolor=#E9E9E9
| 584951 ||  || — || October 15, 2013 || Mount Lemmon || Mount Lemmon Survey ||  || align=right | 1.2 km || 
|-id=952 bgcolor=#E9E9E9
| 584952 ||  || — || October 3, 2013 || Kitt Peak || Spacewatch ||  || align=right | 1.8 km || 
|-id=953 bgcolor=#E9E9E9
| 584953 ||  || — || August 14, 2004 || Cerro Tololo || Cerro Tololo Obs. ||  || align=right | 1.2 km || 
|-id=954 bgcolor=#E9E9E9
| 584954 ||  || — || February 10, 2011 || Mount Lemmon || Mount Lemmon Survey ||  || align=right | 1.1 km || 
|-id=955 bgcolor=#E9E9E9
| 584955 ||  || — || July 30, 2008 || Mount Lemmon || Mount Lemmon Survey ||  || align=right | 1.4 km || 
|-id=956 bgcolor=#fefefe
| 584956 ||  || — || January 1, 2012 || Mount Lemmon || Mount Lemmon Survey ||  || align=right data-sort-value="0.66" | 660 m || 
|-id=957 bgcolor=#E9E9E9
| 584957 ||  || — || March 13, 2007 || Mount Lemmon || Mount Lemmon Survey ||  || align=right data-sort-value="0.75" | 750 m || 
|-id=958 bgcolor=#E9E9E9
| 584958 ||  || — || September 9, 2008 || Mount Lemmon || Mount Lemmon Survey ||  || align=right | 2.0 km || 
|-id=959 bgcolor=#E9E9E9
| 584959 ||  || — || September 4, 2008 || Kitt Peak || Spacewatch ||  || align=right | 1.6 km || 
|-id=960 bgcolor=#d6d6d6
| 584960 ||  || — || March 1, 2008 || Mount Lemmon || Mount Lemmon Survey ||  || align=right | 2.6 km || 
|-id=961 bgcolor=#E9E9E9
| 584961 ||  || — || October 11, 2004 || Kitt Peak || Spacewatch ||  || align=right | 1.5 km || 
|-id=962 bgcolor=#E9E9E9
| 584962 ||  || — || February 12, 2015 || Haleakala || Pan-STARRS ||  || align=right | 1.1 km || 
|-id=963 bgcolor=#E9E9E9
| 584963 ||  || — || June 9, 2016 || Haleakala || Pan-STARRS ||  || align=right data-sort-value="0.75" | 750 m || 
|-id=964 bgcolor=#E9E9E9
| 584964 ||  || — || January 6, 2010 || Mount Lemmon || Mount Lemmon Survey ||  || align=right | 1.6 km || 
|-id=965 bgcolor=#fefefe
| 584965 ||  || — || February 24, 2012 || Mount Lemmon || Mount Lemmon Survey ||  || align=right data-sort-value="0.59" | 590 m || 
|-id=966 bgcolor=#E9E9E9
| 584966 ||  || — || June 5, 2016 || Haleakala || Pan-STARRS ||  || align=right | 1.4 km || 
|-id=967 bgcolor=#E9E9E9
| 584967 ||  || — || October 6, 2008 || Mount Lemmon || Mount Lemmon Survey ||  || align=right | 2.2 km || 
|-id=968 bgcolor=#E9E9E9
| 584968 ||  || — || September 27, 2009 || Mount Lemmon || Mount Lemmon Survey ||  || align=right data-sort-value="0.88" | 880 m || 
|-id=969 bgcolor=#E9E9E9
| 584969 ||  || — || April 10, 2008 || Kitt Peak || Spacewatch ||  || align=right data-sort-value="0.76" | 760 m || 
|-id=970 bgcolor=#E9E9E9
| 584970 ||  || — || December 11, 2013 || Haleakala || Pan-STARRS ||  || align=right | 1.2 km || 
|-id=971 bgcolor=#E9E9E9
| 584971 ||  || — || March 27, 2015 || Haleakala || Pan-STARRS ||  || align=right | 1.8 km || 
|-id=972 bgcolor=#fefefe
| 584972 ||  || — || November 26, 2014 || Haleakala || Pan-STARRS ||  || align=right data-sort-value="0.57" | 570 m || 
|-id=973 bgcolor=#fefefe
| 584973 ||  || — || May 9, 2007 || Kitt Peak || Spacewatch ||  || align=right data-sort-value="0.62" | 620 m || 
|-id=974 bgcolor=#fefefe
| 584974 ||  || — || June 5, 2016 || Haleakala || Pan-STARRS ||  || align=right data-sort-value="0.65" | 650 m || 
|-id=975 bgcolor=#d6d6d6
| 584975 ||  || — || September 25, 2001 || Palomar || NEAT ||  || align=right | 3.9 km || 
|-id=976 bgcolor=#fefefe
| 584976 ||  || — || November 19, 2003 || Kitt Peak || Spacewatch ||  || align=right data-sort-value="0.59" | 590 m || 
|-id=977 bgcolor=#E9E9E9
| 584977 ||  || — || October 1, 1995 || Kitt Peak || Spacewatch ||  || align=right | 1.7 km || 
|-id=978 bgcolor=#d6d6d6
| 584978 ||  || — || September 23, 1995 || Kitt Peak || Spacewatch ||  || align=right | 1.7 km || 
|-id=979 bgcolor=#E9E9E9
| 584979 ||  || — || October 3, 2013 || Haleakala || Pan-STARRS ||  || align=right | 1.2 km || 
|-id=980 bgcolor=#E9E9E9
| 584980 ||  || — || March 10, 2011 || Kitt Peak || Spacewatch ||  || align=right | 1.4 km || 
|-id=981 bgcolor=#E9E9E9
| 584981 ||  || — || January 31, 2006 || Kitt Peak || Spacewatch ||  || align=right | 1.00 km || 
|-id=982 bgcolor=#E9E9E9
| 584982 ||  || — || March 28, 2003 || La Silla || G. Masi, R. Michelsen ||  || align=right | 1.5 km || 
|-id=983 bgcolor=#d6d6d6
| 584983 ||  || — || September 26, 2006 || Mount Lemmon || Mount Lemmon Survey ||  || align=right | 1.8 km || 
|-id=984 bgcolor=#d6d6d6
| 584984 ||  || — || March 21, 2015 || Haleakala || Pan-STARRS ||  || align=right | 2.2 km || 
|-id=985 bgcolor=#fefefe
| 584985 ||  || — || November 27, 2014 || Haleakala || Pan-STARRS ||  || align=right data-sort-value="0.63" | 630 m || 
|-id=986 bgcolor=#d6d6d6
| 584986 ||  || — || October 9, 2012 || Haleakala || Pan-STARRS ||  || align=right | 2.8 km || 
|-id=987 bgcolor=#d6d6d6
| 584987 ||  || — || November 29, 2003 || Kitt Peak || Spacewatch ||  || align=right | 2.3 km || 
|-id=988 bgcolor=#E9E9E9
| 584988 ||  || — || January 23, 2006 || Kitt Peak || Spacewatch ||  || align=right | 2.1 km || 
|-id=989 bgcolor=#fefefe
| 584989 ||  || — || November 5, 2007 || Mount Lemmon || Mount Lemmon Survey ||  || align=right data-sort-value="0.77" | 770 m || 
|-id=990 bgcolor=#d6d6d6
| 584990 ||  || — || March 26, 2009 || Mount Lemmon || Mount Lemmon Survey ||  || align=right | 2.9 km || 
|-id=991 bgcolor=#E9E9E9
| 584991 ||  || — || September 2, 2008 || Kitt Peak || Spacewatch ||  || align=right | 1.5 km || 
|-id=992 bgcolor=#d6d6d6
| 584992 ||  || — || August 10, 2007 || Kitt Peak || Spacewatch ||  || align=right | 2.2 km || 
|-id=993 bgcolor=#E9E9E9
| 584993 ||  || — || October 29, 2008 || Mount Lemmon || Mount Lemmon Survey ||  || align=right | 1.8 km || 
|-id=994 bgcolor=#E9E9E9
| 584994 ||  || — || March 11, 2005 || Mount Lemmon || Mount Lemmon Survey ||  || align=right | 1.8 km || 
|-id=995 bgcolor=#E9E9E9
| 584995 ||  || — || November 11, 2013 || Kitt Peak || Spacewatch ||  || align=right | 1.3 km || 
|-id=996 bgcolor=#E9E9E9
| 584996 ||  || — || September 6, 2008 || Mount Lemmon || Mount Lemmon Survey ||  || align=right | 1.1 km || 
|-id=997 bgcolor=#d6d6d6
| 584997 ||  || — || March 21, 2015 || Haleakala || Pan-STARRS ||  || align=right | 2.0 km || 
|-id=998 bgcolor=#fefefe
| 584998 ||  || — || August 14, 2013 || Haleakala || Pan-STARRS ||  || align=right data-sort-value="0.55" | 550 m || 
|-id=999 bgcolor=#E9E9E9
| 584999 ||  || — || November 28, 2013 || Catalina || CSS ||  || align=right | 1.3 km || 
|-id=000 bgcolor=#fefefe
| 585000 ||  || — || January 19, 2004 || Kitt Peak || Spacewatch ||  || align=right data-sort-value="0.81" | 810 m || 
|}

References

External links 
 Discovery Circumstances: Numbered Minor Planets (580001)–(585000) (IAU Minor Planet Center)

0584